

91001–91100 

|-bgcolor=#E9E9E9
| 91001 Shanghaishida ||  ||  || January 18, 1998 || Xinglong || SCAP || — || align=right | 2.9 km || 
|-id=002 bgcolor=#fefefe
| 91002 ||  || — || January 23, 1998 || Socorro || LINEAR || NYS || align=right | 1.7 km || 
|-id=003 bgcolor=#fefefe
| 91003 ||  || — || January 25, 1998 || Haleakala || NEAT || V || align=right | 2.1 km || 
|-id=004 bgcolor=#fefefe
| 91004 ||  || — || January 26, 1998 || Haleakala || NEAT || — || align=right | 3.8 km || 
|-id=005 bgcolor=#E9E9E9
| 91005 ||  || — || January 24, 1998 || Haleakala || NEAT || — || align=right | 3.1 km || 
|-id=006 bgcolor=#E9E9E9
| 91006 Fleming ||  ||  || January 28, 1998 || Kleť || M. Tichý, Z. Moravec || MAR || align=right | 1.9 km || 
|-id=007 bgcolor=#fefefe
| 91007 Ianfleming ||  ||  || January 30, 1998 || Kleť || J. Tichá, M. Tichý || — || align=right | 2.9 km || 
|-id=008 bgcolor=#fefefe
| 91008 ||  || — || January 23, 1998 || Kitt Peak || Spacewatch || — || align=right | 1.6 km || 
|-id=009 bgcolor=#E9E9E9
| 91009 ||  || — || January 26, 1998 || Haleakala || NEAT || — || align=right | 3.0 km || 
|-id=010 bgcolor=#fefefe
| 91010 ||  || — || February 1, 1998 || Xinglong || SCAP || — || align=right | 5.9 km || 
|-id=011 bgcolor=#E9E9E9
| 91011 ||  || — || February 8, 1998 || Modra || A. Galád, A. Pravda || — || align=right | 1.9 km || 
|-id=012 bgcolor=#E9E9E9
| 91012 || 1998 DY || — || February 18, 1998 || Kleť || Kleť Obs. || — || align=right | 2.8 km || 
|-id=013 bgcolor=#E9E9E9
| 91013 ||  || — || February 20, 1998 || Caussols || ODAS || — || align=right | 3.7 km || 
|-id=014 bgcolor=#E9E9E9
| 91014 ||  || — || February 23, 1998 || Kitt Peak || Spacewatch || — || align=right | 3.1 km || 
|-id=015 bgcolor=#E9E9E9
| 91015 ||  || — || February 25, 1998 || Haleakala || NEAT || — || align=right | 2.9 km || 
|-id=016 bgcolor=#E9E9E9
| 91016 ||  || — || February 22, 1998 || Haleakala || NEAT || — || align=right | 3.4 km || 
|-id=017 bgcolor=#E9E9E9
| 91017 ||  || — || February 25, 1998 || Haleakala || NEAT || — || align=right | 5.0 km || 
|-id=018 bgcolor=#fefefe
| 91018 ||  || — || February 20, 1998 || Caussols || ODAS || NYS || align=right | 1.5 km || 
|-id=019 bgcolor=#fefefe
| 91019 ||  || — || February 26, 1998 || Blauvac || R. Roy || NYS || align=right | 1.6 km || 
|-id=020 bgcolor=#E9E9E9
| 91020 ||  || — || February 24, 1998 || Kitt Peak || Spacewatch || — || align=right | 2.8 km || 
|-id=021 bgcolor=#E9E9E9
| 91021 ||  || — || February 26, 1998 || Kitt Peak || Spacewatch || — || align=right | 3.8 km || 
|-id=022 bgcolor=#E9E9E9
| 91022 ||  || — || February 19, 1998 || Kushiro || S. Ueda, H. Kaneda || — || align=right | 4.3 km || 
|-id=023 bgcolor=#E9E9E9
| 91023 Lutan ||  ||  || February 23, 1998 || Xinglong || SCAP || BRG || align=right | 4.8 km || 
|-id=024 bgcolor=#E9E9E9
| 91024 Széchenyi ||  ||  || February 28, 1998 || Piszkéstető || K. Sárneczky, L. Kiss || — || align=right | 3.0 km || 
|-id=025 bgcolor=#E9E9E9
| 91025 ||  || — || February 27, 1998 || La Silla || E. W. Elst || EUN || align=right | 2.9 km || 
|-id=026 bgcolor=#E9E9E9
| 91026 ||  || — || February 27, 1998 || La Silla || E. W. Elst || — || align=right | 4.4 km || 
|-id=027 bgcolor=#fefefe
| 91027 ||  || — || February 26, 1998 || Reedy Creek || J. Broughton || — || align=right | 2.6 km || 
|-id=028 bgcolor=#E9E9E9
| 91028 ||  || — || February 24, 1998 || Kitt Peak || Spacewatch || — || align=right | 3.2 km || 
|-id=029 bgcolor=#E9E9E9
| 91029 || 1998 EY || — || March 2, 1998 || Caussols || ODAS || — || align=right | 1.7 km || 
|-id=030 bgcolor=#E9E9E9
| 91030 ||  || — || March 2, 1998 || Caussols || ODAS || GAL || align=right | 3.0 km || 
|-id=031 bgcolor=#E9E9E9
| 91031 ||  || — || March 2, 1998 || Caussols || ODAS || — || align=right | 4.0 km || 
|-id=032 bgcolor=#fefefe
| 91032 ||  || — || March 1, 1998 || La Silla || E. W. Elst || — || align=right | 3.0 km || 
|-id=033 bgcolor=#E9E9E9
| 91033 ||  || — || March 3, 1998 || La Silla || E. W. Elst || — || align=right | 2.3 km || 
|-id=034 bgcolor=#fefefe
| 91034 ||  || — || March 1, 1998 || Xinglong || SCAP || H || align=right | 1.5 km || 
|-id=035 bgcolor=#E9E9E9
| 91035 ||  || — || March 5, 1998 || Xinglong || SCAP || EUN || align=right | 2.9 km || 
|-id=036 bgcolor=#fefefe
| 91036 ||  || — || March 22, 1998 || Socorro || LINEAR || H || align=right | 1.1 km || 
|-id=037 bgcolor=#fefefe
| 91037 ||  || — || March 24, 1998 || Socorro || LINEAR || H || align=right | 1.1 km || 
|-id=038 bgcolor=#E9E9E9
| 91038 ||  || — || March 22, 1998 || Kitt Peak || Spacewatch || — || align=right | 5.5 km || 
|-id=039 bgcolor=#E9E9E9
| 91039 ||  || — || March 24, 1998 || Caussols || ODAS || — || align=right | 5.6 km || 
|-id=040 bgcolor=#E9E9E9
| 91040 ||  || — || March 25, 1998 || Haleakala || NEAT || HEN || align=right | 3.1 km || 
|-id=041 bgcolor=#fefefe
| 91041 ||  || — || March 20, 1998 || Socorro || LINEAR || H || align=right | 1.3 km || 
|-id=042 bgcolor=#E9E9E9
| 91042 ||  || — || March 26, 1998 || Kleť || Kleť Obs. || — || align=right | 5.4 km || 
|-id=043 bgcolor=#fefefe
| 91043 ||  || — || March 20, 1998 || Socorro || LINEAR || H || align=right | 1.3 km || 
|-id=044 bgcolor=#FA8072
| 91044 ||  || — || March 22, 1998 || Socorro || LINEAR || H || align=right | 1.1 km || 
|-id=045 bgcolor=#E9E9E9
| 91045 ||  || — || March 20, 1998 || Socorro || LINEAR || — || align=right | 4.5 km || 
|-id=046 bgcolor=#E9E9E9
| 91046 ||  || — || March 20, 1998 || Socorro || LINEAR || — || align=right | 2.7 km || 
|-id=047 bgcolor=#E9E9E9
| 91047 ||  || — || March 20, 1998 || Socorro || LINEAR || — || align=right | 2.0 km || 
|-id=048 bgcolor=#E9E9E9
| 91048 ||  || — || March 20, 1998 || Socorro || LINEAR || — || align=right | 2.4 km || 
|-id=049 bgcolor=#E9E9E9
| 91049 ||  || — || March 20, 1998 || Socorro || LINEAR || — || align=right | 4.2 km || 
|-id=050 bgcolor=#E9E9E9
| 91050 ||  || — || March 20, 1998 || Socorro || LINEAR || — || align=right | 4.6 km || 
|-id=051 bgcolor=#E9E9E9
| 91051 ||  || — || March 20, 1998 || Socorro || LINEAR || — || align=right | 4.7 km || 
|-id=052 bgcolor=#E9E9E9
| 91052 ||  || — || March 20, 1998 || Socorro || LINEAR || — || align=right | 2.0 km || 
|-id=053 bgcolor=#E9E9E9
| 91053 ||  || — || March 20, 1998 || Socorro || LINEAR || MRX || align=right | 2.1 km || 
|-id=054 bgcolor=#E9E9E9
| 91054 ||  || — || March 20, 1998 || Socorro || LINEAR || — || align=right | 4.4 km || 
|-id=055 bgcolor=#E9E9E9
| 91055 ||  || — || March 20, 1998 || Socorro || LINEAR || EUN || align=right | 4.0 km || 
|-id=056 bgcolor=#E9E9E9
| 91056 ||  || — || March 20, 1998 || Socorro || LINEAR || — || align=right | 5.3 km || 
|-id=057 bgcolor=#E9E9E9
| 91057 ||  || — || March 20, 1998 || Socorro || LINEAR || — || align=right | 3.6 km || 
|-id=058 bgcolor=#E9E9E9
| 91058 ||  || — || March 20, 1998 || Socorro || LINEAR || — || align=right | 3.3 km || 
|-id=059 bgcolor=#E9E9E9
| 91059 ||  || — || March 20, 1998 || Socorro || LINEAR || — || align=right | 3.5 km || 
|-id=060 bgcolor=#E9E9E9
| 91060 ||  || — || March 20, 1998 || Socorro || LINEAR || — || align=right | 3.9 km || 
|-id=061 bgcolor=#E9E9E9
| 91061 ||  || — || March 20, 1998 || Socorro || LINEAR || — || align=right | 5.7 km || 
|-id=062 bgcolor=#E9E9E9
| 91062 ||  || — || March 20, 1998 || Socorro || LINEAR || — || align=right | 4.1 km || 
|-id=063 bgcolor=#E9E9E9
| 91063 ||  || — || March 20, 1998 || Socorro || LINEAR || EUN || align=right | 3.6 km || 
|-id=064 bgcolor=#E9E9E9
| 91064 ||  || — || March 20, 1998 || Socorro || LINEAR || — || align=right | 2.9 km || 
|-id=065 bgcolor=#E9E9E9
| 91065 ||  || — || March 20, 1998 || Socorro || LINEAR || — || align=right | 3.7 km || 
|-id=066 bgcolor=#E9E9E9
| 91066 ||  || — || March 20, 1998 || Socorro || LINEAR || EUN || align=right | 4.4 km || 
|-id=067 bgcolor=#E9E9E9
| 91067 ||  || — || March 20, 1998 || Socorro || LINEAR || EUN || align=right | 3.1 km || 
|-id=068 bgcolor=#E9E9E9
| 91068 ||  || — || March 20, 1998 || Socorro || LINEAR || MAR || align=right | 2.9 km || 
|-id=069 bgcolor=#E9E9E9
| 91069 ||  || — || March 20, 1998 || Socorro || LINEAR || — || align=right | 2.2 km || 
|-id=070 bgcolor=#E9E9E9
| 91070 ||  || — || March 20, 1998 || Socorro || LINEAR || EUN || align=right | 4.3 km || 
|-id=071 bgcolor=#E9E9E9
| 91071 ||  || — || March 24, 1998 || Socorro || LINEAR || — || align=right | 2.5 km || 
|-id=072 bgcolor=#E9E9E9
| 91072 ||  || — || March 24, 1998 || Socorro || LINEAR || — || align=right | 4.7 km || 
|-id=073 bgcolor=#E9E9E9
| 91073 ||  || — || March 24, 1998 || Socorro || LINEAR || EUN || align=right | 3.8 km || 
|-id=074 bgcolor=#E9E9E9
| 91074 ||  || — || March 24, 1998 || Socorro || LINEAR || EUN || align=right | 2.4 km || 
|-id=075 bgcolor=#E9E9E9
| 91075 ||  || — || March 31, 1998 || Socorro || LINEAR || — || align=right | 2.6 km || 
|-id=076 bgcolor=#E9E9E9
| 91076 ||  || — || March 31, 1998 || Socorro || LINEAR || ADE || align=right | 4.3 km || 
|-id=077 bgcolor=#E9E9E9
| 91077 ||  || — || March 31, 1998 || Socorro || LINEAR || — || align=right | 3.4 km || 
|-id=078 bgcolor=#E9E9E9
| 91078 ||  || — || March 31, 1998 || Socorro || LINEAR || — || align=right | 4.7 km || 
|-id=079 bgcolor=#E9E9E9
| 91079 ||  || — || March 31, 1998 || Socorro || LINEAR || — || align=right | 2.1 km || 
|-id=080 bgcolor=#E9E9E9
| 91080 ||  || — || March 31, 1998 || Socorro || LINEAR || ADE || align=right | 5.8 km || 
|-id=081 bgcolor=#E9E9E9
| 91081 ||  || — || March 31, 1998 || Socorro || LINEAR || — || align=right | 2.2 km || 
|-id=082 bgcolor=#E9E9E9
| 91082 ||  || — || March 31, 1998 || Socorro || LINEAR || — || align=right | 2.7 km || 
|-id=083 bgcolor=#E9E9E9
| 91083 ||  || — || March 31, 1998 || Socorro || LINEAR || — || align=right | 3.6 km || 
|-id=084 bgcolor=#E9E9E9
| 91084 ||  || — || March 31, 1998 || Socorro || LINEAR || — || align=right | 2.2 km || 
|-id=085 bgcolor=#E9E9E9
| 91085 ||  || — || March 31, 1998 || Socorro || LINEAR || EUN || align=right | 2.6 km || 
|-id=086 bgcolor=#E9E9E9
| 91086 ||  || — || March 20, 1998 || Socorro || LINEAR || EUN || align=right | 2.1 km || 
|-id=087 bgcolor=#E9E9E9
| 91087 ||  || — || March 20, 1998 || Socorro || LINEAR || ADE || align=right | 5.3 km || 
|-id=088 bgcolor=#E9E9E9
| 91088 ||  || — || March 20, 1998 || Socorro || LINEAR || MAR || align=right | 2.4 km || 
|-id=089 bgcolor=#E9E9E9
| 91089 ||  || — || March 24, 1998 || Xinglong || SCAP || — || align=right | 2.7 km || 
|-id=090 bgcolor=#fefefe
| 91090 ||  || — || March 29, 1998 || Socorro || LINEAR || H || align=right | 1.1 km || 
|-id=091 bgcolor=#fefefe
| 91091 ||  || — || March 22, 1998 || Socorro || LINEAR || H || align=right | 1.3 km || 
|-id=092 bgcolor=#E9E9E9
| 91092 ||  || — || March 20, 1998 || Socorro || LINEAR || — || align=right | 3.0 km || 
|-id=093 bgcolor=#E9E9E9
| 91093 || 1998 GS || — || April 3, 1998 || Kitt Peak || Spacewatch || MAR || align=right | 3.1 km || 
|-id=094 bgcolor=#E9E9E9
| 91094 ||  || — || April 2, 1998 || Socorro || LINEAR || EUN || align=right | 3.2 km || 
|-id=095 bgcolor=#E9E9E9
| 91095 ||  || — || April 2, 1998 || Socorro || LINEAR || — || align=right | 5.5 km || 
|-id=096 bgcolor=#fefefe
| 91096 ||  || — || April 15, 1998 || Socorro || LINEAR || — || align=right | 2.6 km || 
|-id=097 bgcolor=#E9E9E9
| 91097 ||  || — || April 2, 1998 || La Silla || E. W. Elst || — || align=right | 2.6 km || 
|-id=098 bgcolor=#fefefe
| 91098 ||  || — || April 21, 1998 || Socorro || LINEAR || H || align=right | 1.4 km || 
|-id=099 bgcolor=#fefefe
| 91099 ||  || — || April 23, 1998 || Socorro || LINEAR || PHO || align=right | 4.6 km || 
|-id=100 bgcolor=#E9E9E9
| 91100 ||  || — || April 25, 1998 || Haleakala || NEAT || — || align=right | 3.5 km || 
|}

91101–91200 

|-bgcolor=#E9E9E9
| 91101 ||  || — || April 20, 1998 || Kitt Peak || Spacewatch || EUN || align=right | 3.0 km || 
|-id=102 bgcolor=#E9E9E9
| 91102 ||  || — || April 18, 1998 || Socorro || LINEAR || — || align=right | 2.6 km || 
|-id=103 bgcolor=#E9E9E9
| 91103 ||  || — || April 20, 1998 || Socorro || LINEAR || — || align=right | 4.4 km || 
|-id=104 bgcolor=#E9E9E9
| 91104 ||  || — || April 18, 1998 || Kitt Peak || Spacewatch || — || align=right | 4.0 km || 
|-id=105 bgcolor=#E9E9E9
| 91105 ||  || — || April 18, 1998 || Kitt Peak || Spacewatch || HOF || align=right | 4.6 km || 
|-id=106 bgcolor=#E9E9E9
| 91106 ||  || — || April 20, 1998 || Socorro || LINEAR || — || align=right | 3.9 km || 
|-id=107 bgcolor=#E9E9E9
| 91107 ||  || — || April 20, 1998 || Socorro || LINEAR || — || align=right | 5.5 km || 
|-id=108 bgcolor=#E9E9E9
| 91108 ||  || — || April 20, 1998 || Socorro || LINEAR || — || align=right | 3.2 km || 
|-id=109 bgcolor=#E9E9E9
| 91109 ||  || — || April 20, 1998 || Socorro || LINEAR || — || align=right | 4.9 km || 
|-id=110 bgcolor=#E9E9E9
| 91110 ||  || — || April 20, 1998 || Socorro || LINEAR || — || align=right | 2.7 km || 
|-id=111 bgcolor=#E9E9E9
| 91111 ||  || — || April 20, 1998 || Socorro || LINEAR || — || align=right | 5.5 km || 
|-id=112 bgcolor=#E9E9E9
| 91112 ||  || — || April 25, 1998 || Woomera || F. B. Zoltowski || RAF || align=right | 3.6 km || 
|-id=113 bgcolor=#E9E9E9
| 91113 ||  || — || April 21, 1998 || Socorro || LINEAR || — || align=right | 4.1 km || 
|-id=114 bgcolor=#d6d6d6
| 91114 ||  || — || April 21, 1998 || Socorro || LINEAR || BRA || align=right | 3.2 km || 
|-id=115 bgcolor=#E9E9E9
| 91115 ||  || — || April 21, 1998 || Socorro || LINEAR || — || align=right | 6.8 km || 
|-id=116 bgcolor=#E9E9E9
| 91116 ||  || — || April 21, 1998 || Socorro || LINEAR || — || align=right | 3.8 km || 
|-id=117 bgcolor=#E9E9E9
| 91117 ||  || — || April 21, 1998 || Socorro || LINEAR || — || align=right | 3.8 km || 
|-id=118 bgcolor=#E9E9E9
| 91118 ||  || — || April 21, 1998 || Socorro || LINEAR || NEM || align=right | 5.4 km || 
|-id=119 bgcolor=#E9E9E9
| 91119 ||  || — || April 21, 1998 || Socorro || LINEAR || — || align=right | 3.4 km || 
|-id=120 bgcolor=#E9E9E9
| 91120 ||  || — || April 21, 1998 || Socorro || LINEAR || — || align=right | 5.5 km || 
|-id=121 bgcolor=#E9E9E9
| 91121 ||  || — || April 23, 1998 || Socorro || LINEAR || — || align=right | 3.9 km || 
|-id=122 bgcolor=#E9E9E9
| 91122 ||  || — || April 23, 1998 || Socorro || LINEAR || — || align=right | 2.8 km || 
|-id=123 bgcolor=#E9E9E9
| 91123 ||  || — || April 23, 1998 || Socorro || LINEAR || — || align=right | 5.3 km || 
|-id=124 bgcolor=#E9E9E9
| 91124 ||  || — || April 23, 1998 || Socorro || LINEAR || — || align=right | 5.5 km || 
|-id=125 bgcolor=#E9E9E9
| 91125 ||  || — || April 23, 1998 || Socorro || LINEAR || EUN || align=right | 2.4 km || 
|-id=126 bgcolor=#E9E9E9
| 91126 ||  || — || April 23, 1998 || Socorro || LINEAR || EUN || align=right | 3.3 km || 
|-id=127 bgcolor=#E9E9E9
| 91127 ||  || — || April 23, 1998 || Socorro || LINEAR || — || align=right | 4.4 km || 
|-id=128 bgcolor=#E9E9E9
| 91128 ||  || — || April 19, 1998 || Socorro || LINEAR || — || align=right | 4.8 km || 
|-id=129 bgcolor=#E9E9E9
| 91129 ||  || — || April 19, 1998 || Socorro || LINEAR || — || align=right | 3.3 km || 
|-id=130 bgcolor=#E9E9E9
| 91130 ||  || — || April 21, 1998 || Socorro || LINEAR || WIT || align=right | 3.2 km || 
|-id=131 bgcolor=#E9E9E9
| 91131 ||  || — || April 21, 1998 || Socorro || LINEAR || — || align=right | 4.4 km || 
|-id=132 bgcolor=#E9E9E9
| 91132 ||  || — || April 20, 1998 || Socorro || LINEAR || — || align=right | 4.2 km || 
|-id=133 bgcolor=#C2E0FF
| 91133 ||  || — || April 28, 1998 || Mauna Kea || Mauna Kea Obs. || plutinocritical || align=right | 134 km || 
|-id=134 bgcolor=#E9E9E9
| 91134 ||  || — || April 29, 1998 || Kitt Peak || Spacewatch || — || align=right | 7.0 km || 
|-id=135 bgcolor=#E9E9E9
| 91135 ||  || — || April 19, 1998 || Socorro || LINEAR || — || align=right | 3.8 km || 
|-id=136 bgcolor=#E9E9E9
| 91136 ||  || — || May 22, 1998 || Socorro || LINEAR || BRU || align=right | 6.5 km || 
|-id=137 bgcolor=#E9E9E9
| 91137 ||  || — || May 22, 1998 || Socorro || LINEAR || EUN || align=right | 3.4 km || 
|-id=138 bgcolor=#E9E9E9
| 91138 ||  || — || May 22, 1998 || Socorro || LINEAR || — || align=right | 2.3 km || 
|-id=139 bgcolor=#E9E9E9
| 91139 ||  || — || May 22, 1998 || Socorro || LINEAR || — || align=right | 3.9 km || 
|-id=140 bgcolor=#E9E9E9
| 91140 ||  || — || June 1, 1998 || La Silla || E. W. Elst || — || align=right | 5.6 km || 
|-id=141 bgcolor=#E9E9E9
| 91141 ||  || — || June 3, 1998 || Socorro || LINEAR || — || align=right | 8.3 km || 
|-id=142 bgcolor=#d6d6d6
| 91142 ||  || — || June 20, 1998 || Caussols || ODAS || — || align=right | 7.2 km || 
|-id=143 bgcolor=#d6d6d6
| 91143 ||  || — || June 19, 1998 || Kitt Peak || Spacewatch || KOR || align=right | 3.1 km || 
|-id=144 bgcolor=#d6d6d6
| 91144 ||  || — || June 24, 1998 || Socorro || LINEAR || — || align=right | 5.7 km || 
|-id=145 bgcolor=#d6d6d6
| 91145 || 1998 OX || — || July 20, 1998 || Caussols || ODAS || EOS || align=right | 4.2 km || 
|-id=146 bgcolor=#d6d6d6
| 91146 ||  || — || July 20, 1998 || San Marcello || M. Tombelli, L. Tesi || EMA || align=right | 6.6 km || 
|-id=147 bgcolor=#d6d6d6
| 91147 ||  || — || July 16, 1998 || Kitt Peak || Spacewatch || — || align=right | 4.3 km || 
|-id=148 bgcolor=#d6d6d6
| 91148 ||  || — || July 20, 1998 || Caussols || ODAS || URS || align=right | 4.3 km || 
|-id=149 bgcolor=#d6d6d6
| 91149 || 1998 PS || — || August 15, 1998 || Prescott || P. G. Comba || THM || align=right | 4.1 km || 
|-id=150 bgcolor=#d6d6d6
| 91150 ||  || — || August 26, 1998 || Xinglong || SCAP || — || align=right | 7.9 km || 
|-id=151 bgcolor=#d6d6d6
| 91151 ||  || — || August 17, 1998 || Socorro || LINEAR || — || align=right | 8.7 km || 
|-id=152 bgcolor=#d6d6d6
| 91152 ||  || — || August 17, 1998 || Socorro || LINEAR || — || align=right | 12 km || 
|-id=153 bgcolor=#d6d6d6
| 91153 ||  || — || August 17, 1998 || Socorro || LINEAR || THM || align=right | 5.1 km || 
|-id=154 bgcolor=#d6d6d6
| 91154 ||  || — || August 17, 1998 || Socorro || LINEAR || — || align=right | 8.9 km || 
|-id=155 bgcolor=#d6d6d6
| 91155 ||  || — || August 17, 1998 || Socorro || LINEAR || — || align=right | 10 km || 
|-id=156 bgcolor=#d6d6d6
| 91156 ||  || — || August 31, 1998 || Modra || A. Galád, J. Tóth || — || align=right | 6.2 km || 
|-id=157 bgcolor=#d6d6d6
| 91157 ||  || — || August 26, 1998 || Xinglong || SCAP || — || align=right | 7.4 km || 
|-id=158 bgcolor=#d6d6d6
| 91158 ||  || — || August 24, 1998 || Socorro || LINEAR || URS || align=right | 9.1 km || 
|-id=159 bgcolor=#d6d6d6
| 91159 ||  || — || August 24, 1998 || Socorro || LINEAR || — || align=right | 8.9 km || 
|-id=160 bgcolor=#d6d6d6
| 91160 ||  || — || August 24, 1998 || Socorro || LINEAR || — || align=right | 7.1 km || 
|-id=161 bgcolor=#d6d6d6
| 91161 ||  || — || August 24, 1998 || Socorro || LINEAR || EUP || align=right | 6.7 km || 
|-id=162 bgcolor=#d6d6d6
| 91162 ||  || — || August 24, 1998 || Socorro || LINEAR || — || align=right | 7.4 km || 
|-id=163 bgcolor=#d6d6d6
| 91163 ||  || — || August 24, 1998 || Socorro || LINEAR || ALA || align=right | 12 km || 
|-id=164 bgcolor=#d6d6d6
| 91164 ||  || — || August 24, 1998 || Socorro || LINEAR || — || align=right | 11 km || 
|-id=165 bgcolor=#d6d6d6
| 91165 ||  || — || August 24, 1998 || Socorro || LINEAR || — || align=right | 8.3 km || 
|-id=166 bgcolor=#d6d6d6
| 91166 ||  || — || August 24, 1998 || Socorro || LINEAR || INA || align=right | 8.0 km || 
|-id=167 bgcolor=#d6d6d6
| 91167 ||  || — || August 24, 1998 || Socorro || LINEAR || — || align=right | 6.3 km || 
|-id=168 bgcolor=#d6d6d6
| 91168 ||  || — || August 24, 1998 || Socorro || LINEAR || URS || align=right | 7.6 km || 
|-id=169 bgcolor=#d6d6d6
| 91169 ||  || — || August 17, 1998 || Socorro || LINEAR || HYG || align=right | 6.9 km || 
|-id=170 bgcolor=#d6d6d6
| 91170 ||  || — || August 21, 1998 || Haleakala || NEAT || THM || align=right | 5.8 km || 
|-id=171 bgcolor=#d6d6d6
| 91171 ||  || — || August 23, 1998 || Socorro || LINEAR || — || align=right | 8.3 km || 
|-id=172 bgcolor=#d6d6d6
| 91172 ||  || — || September 15, 1998 || Caussols || ODAS || VER || align=right | 5.8 km || 
|-id=173 bgcolor=#d6d6d6
| 91173 ||  || — || September 12, 1998 || Kitt Peak || Spacewatch || — || align=right | 3.3 km || 
|-id=174 bgcolor=#d6d6d6
| 91174 ||  || — || September 14, 1998 || Socorro || LINEAR || — || align=right | 4.3 km || 
|-id=175 bgcolor=#d6d6d6
| 91175 ||  || — || September 14, 1998 || Socorro || LINEAR || — || align=right | 6.8 km || 
|-id=176 bgcolor=#d6d6d6
| 91176 ||  || — || September 14, 1998 || Socorro || LINEAR || — || align=right | 9.2 km || 
|-id=177 bgcolor=#d6d6d6
| 91177 ||  || — || September 14, 1998 || Socorro || LINEAR || HYG || align=right | 7.0 km || 
|-id=178 bgcolor=#d6d6d6
| 91178 ||  || — || September 14, 1998 || Socorro || LINEAR || HYG || align=right | 7.0 km || 
|-id=179 bgcolor=#d6d6d6
| 91179 ||  || — || September 14, 1998 || Socorro || LINEAR || — || align=right | 6.0 km || 
|-id=180 bgcolor=#d6d6d6
| 91180 ||  || — || September 14, 1998 || Socorro || LINEAR || THM || align=right | 4.8 km || 
|-id=181 bgcolor=#d6d6d6
| 91181 ||  || — || September 14, 1998 || Socorro || LINEAR || — || align=right | 7.4 km || 
|-id=182 bgcolor=#d6d6d6
| 91182 ||  || — || September 14, 1998 || Socorro || LINEAR || 2:1J || align=right | 5.0 km || 
|-id=183 bgcolor=#d6d6d6
| 91183 ||  || — || September 14, 1998 || Socorro || LINEAR || — || align=right | 9.0 km || 
|-id=184 bgcolor=#d6d6d6
| 91184 ||  || — || September 14, 1998 || Socorro || LINEAR || — || align=right | 6.7 km || 
|-id=185 bgcolor=#d6d6d6
| 91185 ||  || — || September 14, 1998 || Socorro || LINEAR || — || align=right | 7.3 km || 
|-id=186 bgcolor=#d6d6d6
| 91186 ||  || — || September 14, 1998 || Socorro || LINEAR || — || align=right | 5.2 km || 
|-id=187 bgcolor=#d6d6d6
| 91187 ||  || — || September 14, 1998 || Socorro || LINEAR || TIR || align=right | 9.0 km || 
|-id=188 bgcolor=#d6d6d6
| 91188 ||  || — || September 14, 1998 || Socorro || LINEAR || — || align=right | 6.9 km || 
|-id=189 bgcolor=#d6d6d6
| 91189 ||  || — || September 16, 1998 || Caussols || ODAS || Tj (2.91) || align=right | 8.4 km || 
|-id=190 bgcolor=#d6d6d6
| 91190 ||  || — || September 29, 1998 || Socorro || LINEAR || HYG || align=right | 7.9 km || 
|-id=191 bgcolor=#d6d6d6
| 91191 ||  || — || September 16, 1998 || Anderson Mesa || LONEOS || — || align=right | 15 km || 
|-id=192 bgcolor=#d6d6d6
| 91192 ||  || — || September 17, 1998 || Anderson Mesa || LONEOS || URS || align=right | 12 km || 
|-id=193 bgcolor=#d6d6d6
| 91193 ||  || — || September 19, 1998 || Socorro || LINEAR || ALA || align=right | 6.6 km || 
|-id=194 bgcolor=#d6d6d6
| 91194 ||  || — || September 26, 1998 || Socorro || LINEAR || URS || align=right | 9.2 km || 
|-id=195 bgcolor=#d6d6d6
| 91195 ||  || — || September 26, 1998 || Socorro || LINEAR || — || align=right | 8.1 km || 
|-id=196 bgcolor=#d6d6d6
| 91196 ||  || — || September 26, 1998 || Socorro || LINEAR || — || align=right | 7.1 km || 
|-id=197 bgcolor=#d6d6d6
| 91197 ||  || — || September 26, 1998 || Socorro || LINEAR || — || align=right | 6.3 km || 
|-id=198 bgcolor=#d6d6d6
| 91198 ||  || — || September 26, 1998 || Socorro || LINEAR || — || align=right | 6.8 km || 
|-id=199 bgcolor=#d6d6d6
| 91199 Johngray ||  ||  || September 20, 1998 || La Silla || E. W. Elst || ALA || align=right | 10 km || 
|-id=200 bgcolor=#d6d6d6
| 91200 ||  || — || September 26, 1998 || Socorro || LINEAR || EUP || align=right | 8.3 km || 
|}

91201–91300 

|-bgcolor=#d6d6d6
| 91201 ||  || — || September 26, 1998 || Socorro || LINEAR || URS || align=right | 9.0 km || 
|-id=202 bgcolor=#d6d6d6
| 91202 ||  || — || September 25, 1998 || Anderson Mesa || LONEOS || — || align=right | 6.6 km || 
|-id=203 bgcolor=#fefefe
| 91203 ||  || — || October 19, 1998 || Xinglong || SCAP || — || align=right | 1.5 km || 
|-id=204 bgcolor=#d6d6d6
| 91204 ||  || — || October 28, 1998 || Socorro || LINEAR || — || align=right | 12 km || 
|-id=205 bgcolor=#C2E0FF
| 91205 ||  || — || October 22, 1998 || Kitt Peak || M. W. Buie || plutinocritical || align=right | 111 km || 
|-id=206 bgcolor=#fefefe
| 91206 ||  || — || November 24, 1998 || Višnjan Observatory || K. Korlević || — || align=right | 1.8 km || 
|-id=207 bgcolor=#d6d6d6
| 91207 ||  || — || December 14, 1998 || Socorro || LINEAR || — || align=right | 11 km || 
|-id=208 bgcolor=#fefefe
| 91208 ||  || — || December 15, 1998 || Socorro || LINEAR || — || align=right | 1.8 km || 
|-id=209 bgcolor=#fefefe
| 91209 ||  || — || December 14, 1998 || Socorro || LINEAR || — || align=right | 1.8 km || 
|-id=210 bgcolor=#FA8072
| 91210 ||  || — || December 11, 1998 || Mérida || O. A. Naranjo || — || align=right | 1.2 km || 
|-id=211 bgcolor=#fefefe
| 91211 ||  || — || December 17, 1998 || Caussols || ODAS || V || align=right | 1.7 km || 
|-id=212 bgcolor=#fefefe
| 91212 ||  || — || December 24, 1998 || Catalina || CSS || — || align=right | 4.3 km || 
|-id=213 bgcolor=#fefefe
| 91213 Botchan ||  ||  || December 22, 1998 || Kuma Kogen || A. Nakamura || FLO || align=right | 1.0 km || 
|-id=214 bgcolor=#fefefe
| 91214 Diclemente ||  ||  || December 23, 1998 || San Marcello || A. Boattini, L. Tesi || — || align=right | 1.3 km || 
|-id=215 bgcolor=#fefefe
| 91215 || 1999 AN || — || January 5, 1999 || Ondřejov || L. Kotková, L. Vašta || NYS || align=right | 2.1 km || 
|-id=216 bgcolor=#fefefe
| 91216 ||  || — || January 10, 1999 || Oizumi || T. Kobayashi || — || align=right | 2.4 km || 
|-id=217 bgcolor=#fefefe
| 91217 ||  || — || January 11, 1999 || Oizumi || T. Kobayashi || — || align=right | 2.2 km || 
|-id=218 bgcolor=#fefefe
| 91218 ||  || — || January 10, 1999 || Nachi-Katsuura || Y. Shimizu, T. Urata || — || align=right | 3.0 km || 
|-id=219 bgcolor=#fefefe
| 91219 ||  || — || January 11, 1999 || Višnjan Observatory || K. Korlević || — || align=right | 1.6 km || 
|-id=220 bgcolor=#fefefe
| 91220 ||  || — || January 13, 1999 || Oizumi || T. Kobayashi || — || align=right | 2.4 km || 
|-id=221 bgcolor=#fefefe
| 91221 ||  || — || January 9, 1999 || Kitt Peak || Spacewatch || FLO || align=right | 1.9 km || 
|-id=222 bgcolor=#fefefe
| 91222 ||  || — || January 9, 1999 || Kitt Peak || Spacewatch || NYS || align=right | 1.4 km || 
|-id=223 bgcolor=#fefefe
| 91223 ||  || — || January 13, 1999 || Kitt Peak || Spacewatch || MAS || align=right | 1.6 km || 
|-id=224 bgcolor=#fefefe
| 91224 || 1999 BH || — || January 16, 1999 || Oizumi || T. Kobayashi || — || align=right | 1.7 km || 
|-id=225 bgcolor=#fefefe
| 91225 ||  || — || January 20, 1999 || Kleť || Kleť Obs. || NYS || align=right | 4.6 km || 
|-id=226 bgcolor=#fefefe
| 91226 ||  || — || January 22, 1999 || Kleť || Kleť Obs. || NYS || align=right | 1.7 km || 
|-id=227 bgcolor=#FA8072
| 91227 ||  || — || January 22, 1999 || Višnjan Observatory || K. Korlević || — || align=right | 1.6 km || 
|-id=228 bgcolor=#fefefe
| 91228 ||  || — || January 24, 1999 || Višnjan Observatory || K. Korlević || FLO || align=right | 2.0 km || 
|-id=229 bgcolor=#fefefe
| 91229 ||  || — || January 26, 1999 || Višnjan Observatory || K. Korlević || — || align=right | 6.2 km || 
|-id=230 bgcolor=#fefefe
| 91230 ||  || — || January 16, 1999 || Socorro || LINEAR || — || align=right | 2.8 km || 
|-id=231 bgcolor=#fefefe
| 91231 ||  || — || January 18, 1999 || Socorro || LINEAR || — || align=right | 2.6 km || 
|-id=232 bgcolor=#fefefe
| 91232 ||  || — || January 18, 1999 || Socorro || LINEAR || — || align=right | 2.5 km || 
|-id=233 bgcolor=#fefefe
| 91233 ||  || — || February 6, 1999 || Dynic || Y. Ikari || — || align=right | 1.8 km || 
|-id=234 bgcolor=#fefefe
| 91234 ||  || — || February 7, 1999 || Oizumi || T. Kobayashi || — || align=right | 2.2 km || 
|-id=235 bgcolor=#fefefe
| 91235 ||  || — || February 7, 1999 || Oizumi || T. Kobayashi || — || align=right | 2.7 km || 
|-id=236 bgcolor=#fefefe
| 91236 ||  || — || February 6, 1999 || Višnjan Observatory || K. Korlević || — || align=right | 3.8 km || 
|-id=237 bgcolor=#fefefe
| 91237 ||  || — || February 10, 1999 || Socorro || LINEAR || — || align=right | 3.4 km || 
|-id=238 bgcolor=#fefefe
| 91238 ||  || — || February 13, 1999 || Socorro || LINEAR || — || align=right | 2.0 km || 
|-id=239 bgcolor=#fefefe
| 91239 ||  || — || February 15, 1999 || Baton Rouge || Highland Road Park Obs. || NYS || align=right | 1.5 km || 
|-id=240 bgcolor=#fefefe
| 91240 ||  || — || February 10, 1999 || Socorro || LINEAR || FLO || align=right | 1.4 km || 
|-id=241 bgcolor=#fefefe
| 91241 ||  || — || February 10, 1999 || Socorro || LINEAR || NYS || align=right | 1.2 km || 
|-id=242 bgcolor=#fefefe
| 91242 ||  || — || February 10, 1999 || Socorro || LINEAR || — || align=right | 2.5 km || 
|-id=243 bgcolor=#fefefe
| 91243 ||  || — || February 10, 1999 || Socorro || LINEAR || NYS || align=right | 1.3 km || 
|-id=244 bgcolor=#fefefe
| 91244 ||  || — || February 10, 1999 || Socorro || LINEAR || — || align=right | 1.8 km || 
|-id=245 bgcolor=#fefefe
| 91245 ||  || — || February 10, 1999 || Socorro || LINEAR || — || align=right | 4.6 km || 
|-id=246 bgcolor=#fefefe
| 91246 ||  || — || February 10, 1999 || Socorro || LINEAR || — || align=right | 1.6 km || 
|-id=247 bgcolor=#fefefe
| 91247 ||  || — || February 10, 1999 || Socorro || LINEAR || — || align=right | 2.4 km || 
|-id=248 bgcolor=#fefefe
| 91248 ||  || — || February 10, 1999 || Socorro || LINEAR || — || align=right | 2.7 km || 
|-id=249 bgcolor=#fefefe
| 91249 ||  || — || February 10, 1999 || Socorro || LINEAR || — || align=right | 2.0 km || 
|-id=250 bgcolor=#fefefe
| 91250 ||  || — || February 10, 1999 || Socorro || LINEAR || NYS || align=right | 3.5 km || 
|-id=251 bgcolor=#fefefe
| 91251 ||  || — || February 10, 1999 || Socorro || LINEAR || — || align=right | 2.0 km || 
|-id=252 bgcolor=#fefefe
| 91252 ||  || — || February 10, 1999 || Socorro || LINEAR || PHO || align=right | 3.5 km || 
|-id=253 bgcolor=#fefefe
| 91253 ||  || — || February 12, 1999 || Socorro || LINEAR || FLO || align=right | 1.8 km || 
|-id=254 bgcolor=#fefefe
| 91254 ||  || — || February 12, 1999 || Socorro || LINEAR || — || align=right | 1.8 km || 
|-id=255 bgcolor=#fefefe
| 91255 ||  || — || February 12, 1999 || Socorro || LINEAR || NYS || align=right | 1.7 km || 
|-id=256 bgcolor=#fefefe
| 91256 ||  || — || February 12, 1999 || Socorro || LINEAR || FLO || align=right | 3.1 km || 
|-id=257 bgcolor=#fefefe
| 91257 ||  || — || February 13, 1999 || Monte Agliale || E. Mazzoni || — || align=right | 1.7 km || 
|-id=258 bgcolor=#fefefe
| 91258 ||  || — || February 10, 1999 || Socorro || LINEAR || V || align=right | 1.9 km || 
|-id=259 bgcolor=#fefefe
| 91259 ||  || — || February 10, 1999 || Socorro || LINEAR || FLO || align=right | 2.4 km || 
|-id=260 bgcolor=#fefefe
| 91260 ||  || — || February 10, 1999 || Socorro || LINEAR || — || align=right | 2.4 km || 
|-id=261 bgcolor=#fefefe
| 91261 ||  || — || February 10, 1999 || Socorro || LINEAR || FLO || align=right | 1.8 km || 
|-id=262 bgcolor=#fefefe
| 91262 ||  || — || February 10, 1999 || Socorro || LINEAR || V || align=right | 1.5 km || 
|-id=263 bgcolor=#fefefe
| 91263 ||  || — || February 12, 1999 || Socorro || LINEAR || — || align=right | 1.7 km || 
|-id=264 bgcolor=#fefefe
| 91264 ||  || — || February 12, 1999 || Socorro || LINEAR || NYS || align=right | 2.6 km || 
|-id=265 bgcolor=#fefefe
| 91265 ||  || — || February 12, 1999 || Socorro || LINEAR || — || align=right | 3.9 km || 
|-id=266 bgcolor=#fefefe
| 91266 ||  || — || February 12, 1999 || Socorro || LINEAR || — || align=right | 1.9 km || 
|-id=267 bgcolor=#fefefe
| 91267 ||  || — || February 12, 1999 || Socorro || LINEAR || V || align=right | 1.6 km || 
|-id=268 bgcolor=#fefefe
| 91268 ||  || — || February 8, 1999 || Kitt Peak || Spacewatch || — || align=right | 1.6 km || 
|-id=269 bgcolor=#fefefe
| 91269 ||  || — || February 9, 1999 || Kitt Peak || Spacewatch || FLO || align=right | 1.4 km || 
|-id=270 bgcolor=#fefefe
| 91270 ||  || — || February 9, 1999 || Kitt Peak || Spacewatch || NYS || align=right | 3.7 km || 
|-id=271 bgcolor=#fefefe
| 91271 ||  || — || February 9, 1999 || Kitt Peak || Spacewatch || — || align=right | 1.6 km || 
|-id=272 bgcolor=#fefefe
| 91272 ||  || — || February 10, 1999 || Kitt Peak || Spacewatch || — || align=right | 1.9 km || 
|-id=273 bgcolor=#d6d6d6
| 91273 || 1999 DN || — || February 16, 1999 || Caussols || ODAS || HIL3:2 || align=right | 14 km || 
|-id=274 bgcolor=#fefefe
| 91274 ||  || — || February 18, 1999 || Višnjan Observatory || K. Korlević, M. Jurić || NYS || align=right | 2.2 km || 
|-id=275 bgcolor=#fefefe
| 91275 Billsmith ||  ||  || March 13, 1999 || Goodricke-Pigott || R. A. Tucker || NYS || align=right | 1.2 km || 
|-id=276 bgcolor=#fefefe
| 91276 ||  || — || March 14, 1999 || Kitt Peak || Spacewatch || — || align=right | 2.2 km || 
|-id=277 bgcolor=#fefefe
| 91277 ||  || — || March 14, 1999 || Kitt Peak || Spacewatch || — || align=right | 4.1 km || 
|-id=278 bgcolor=#fefefe
| 91278 ||  || — || March 14, 1999 || Kitt Peak || Spacewatch || — || align=right | 1.6 km || 
|-id=279 bgcolor=#fefefe
| 91279 ||  || — || March 14, 1999 || Kitt Peak || Spacewatch || — || align=right | 2.1 km || 
|-id=280 bgcolor=#fefefe
| 91280 ||  || — || March 15, 1999 || Kitt Peak || Spacewatch || MAS || align=right | 1.6 km || 
|-id=281 bgcolor=#fefefe
| 91281 ||  || — || March 12, 1999 || Socorro || LINEAR || PHO || align=right | 5.6 km || 
|-id=282 bgcolor=#E9E9E9
| 91282 ||  || — || March 16, 1999 || Kitt Peak || Spacewatch || — || align=right | 2.5 km || 
|-id=283 bgcolor=#fefefe
| 91283 ||  || — || March 16, 1999 || Kitt Peak || Spacewatch || ERI || align=right | 1.8 km || 
|-id=284 bgcolor=#fefefe
| 91284 ||  || — || March 19, 1999 || Fountain Hills || C. W. Juels || — || align=right | 2.1 km || 
|-id=285 bgcolor=#fefefe
| 91285 ||  || — || March 22, 1999 || Anderson Mesa || LONEOS || — || align=right | 5.0 km || 
|-id=286 bgcolor=#fefefe
| 91286 ||  || — || March 23, 1999 || Kitt Peak || Spacewatch || MAS || align=right | 1.8 km || 
|-id=287 bgcolor=#fefefe
| 91287 Simon-Garfunkel ||  ||  || March 21, 1999 || Wykrota || C. Jacques || FLO || align=right | 1.7 km || 
|-id=288 bgcolor=#fefefe
| 91288 ||  || — || March 19, 1999 || Socorro || LINEAR || — || align=right | 4.4 km || 
|-id=289 bgcolor=#fefefe
| 91289 ||  || — || March 19, 1999 || Socorro || LINEAR || — || align=right | 2.3 km || 
|-id=290 bgcolor=#fefefe
| 91290 ||  || — || March 19, 1999 || Socorro || LINEAR || V || align=right | 3.1 km || 
|-id=291 bgcolor=#E9E9E9
| 91291 ||  || — || March 19, 1999 || Socorro || LINEAR || — || align=right | 3.1 km || 
|-id=292 bgcolor=#fefefe
| 91292 ||  || — || March 19, 1999 || Socorro || LINEAR || FLO || align=right | 2.6 km || 
|-id=293 bgcolor=#E9E9E9
| 91293 ||  || — || March 19, 1999 || Socorro || LINEAR || — || align=right | 7.3 km || 
|-id=294 bgcolor=#fefefe
| 91294 ||  || — || March 19, 1999 || Socorro || LINEAR || — || align=right | 2.1 km || 
|-id=295 bgcolor=#fefefe
| 91295 ||  || — || March 19, 1999 || Socorro || LINEAR || — || align=right | 2.1 km || 
|-id=296 bgcolor=#fefefe
| 91296 ||  || — || March 19, 1999 || Socorro || LINEAR || FLO || align=right | 2.4 km || 
|-id=297 bgcolor=#fefefe
| 91297 ||  || — || March 19, 1999 || Socorro || LINEAR || V || align=right | 1.6 km || 
|-id=298 bgcolor=#E9E9E9
| 91298 ||  || — || March 19, 1999 || Socorro || LINEAR || — || align=right | 2.9 km || 
|-id=299 bgcolor=#fefefe
| 91299 ||  || — || March 19, 1999 || Socorro || LINEAR || — || align=right | 1.8 km || 
|-id=300 bgcolor=#fefefe
| 91300 ||  || — || March 19, 1999 || Socorro || LINEAR || V || align=right | 2.3 km || 
|}

91301–91400 

|-bgcolor=#fefefe
| 91301 ||  || — || March 20, 1999 || Socorro || LINEAR || — || align=right | 2.4 km || 
|-id=302 bgcolor=#E9E9E9
| 91302 ||  || — || March 20, 1999 || Socorro || LINEAR || — || align=right | 3.0 km || 
|-id=303 bgcolor=#fefefe
| 91303 ||  || — || March 20, 1999 || Socorro || LINEAR || — || align=right | 1.7 km || 
|-id=304 bgcolor=#d6d6d6
| 91304 ||  || — || March 20, 1999 || Socorro || LINEAR || HIL3:2 || align=right | 18 km || 
|-id=305 bgcolor=#fefefe
| 91305 ||  || — || March 20, 1999 || Socorro || LINEAR || — || align=right | 2.3 km || 
|-id=306 bgcolor=#fefefe
| 91306 ||  || — || March 20, 1999 || Socorro || LINEAR || NYS || align=right | 1.4 km || 
|-id=307 bgcolor=#fefefe
| 91307 ||  || — || March 20, 1999 || Socorro || LINEAR || — || align=right | 2.3 km || 
|-id=308 bgcolor=#fefefe
| 91308 ||  || — || March 20, 1999 || Socorro || LINEAR || — || align=right | 2.7 km || 
|-id=309 bgcolor=#fefefe
| 91309 ||  || — || March 20, 1999 || Socorro || LINEAR || — || align=right | 3.3 km || 
|-id=310 bgcolor=#fefefe
| 91310 ||  || — || April 6, 1999 || Xinglong || SCAP || — || align=right | 2.0 km || 
|-id=311 bgcolor=#fefefe
| 91311 ||  || — || April 15, 1999 || Socorro || LINEAR || PHO || align=right | 2.5 km || 
|-id=312 bgcolor=#fefefe
| 91312 ||  || — || April 13, 1999 || Višnjan Observatory || K. Korlević, M. Jurić || — || align=right | 4.7 km || 
|-id=313 bgcolor=#fefefe
| 91313 ||  || — || April 7, 1999 || Anderson Mesa || LONEOS || MAS || align=right | 2.0 km || 
|-id=314 bgcolor=#fefefe
| 91314 ||  || — || April 9, 1999 || Anderson Mesa || LONEOS || — || align=right | 2.0 km || 
|-id=315 bgcolor=#fefefe
| 91315 ||  || — || April 9, 1999 || Anderson Mesa || LONEOS || — || align=right | 2.4 km || 
|-id=316 bgcolor=#E9E9E9
| 91316 ||  || — || April 14, 1999 || Kitt Peak || Spacewatch || — || align=right | 1.5 km || 
|-id=317 bgcolor=#fefefe
| 91317 ||  || — || April 15, 1999 || Socorro || LINEAR || — || align=right | 2.0 km || 
|-id=318 bgcolor=#fefefe
| 91318 ||  || — || April 15, 1999 || Socorro || LINEAR || — || align=right | 5.4 km || 
|-id=319 bgcolor=#fefefe
| 91319 ||  || — || April 6, 1999 || Socorro || LINEAR || — || align=right | 1.7 km || 
|-id=320 bgcolor=#fefefe
| 91320 ||  || — || April 6, 1999 || Socorro || LINEAR || NYS || align=right | 1.6 km || 
|-id=321 bgcolor=#E9E9E9
| 91321 ||  || — || April 7, 1999 || Socorro || LINEAR || KON || align=right | 4.7 km || 
|-id=322 bgcolor=#E9E9E9
| 91322 ||  || — || April 7, 1999 || Socorro || LINEAR || EUN || align=right | 3.3 km || 
|-id=323 bgcolor=#fefefe
| 91323 ||  || — || April 6, 1999 || Socorro || LINEAR || NYS || align=right | 1.7 km || 
|-id=324 bgcolor=#fefefe
| 91324 ||  || — || April 12, 1999 || Socorro || LINEAR || V || align=right | 1.5 km || 
|-id=325 bgcolor=#fefefe
| 91325 ||  || — || April 6, 1999 || Anderson Mesa || LONEOS || — || align=right | 4.2 km || 
|-id=326 bgcolor=#fefefe
| 91326 ||  || — || April 11, 1999 || Anderson Mesa || LONEOS || FLO || align=right | 2.6 km || 
|-id=327 bgcolor=#fefefe
| 91327 ||  || — || April 11, 1999 || Anderson Mesa || LONEOS || — || align=right | 3.3 km || 
|-id=328 bgcolor=#E9E9E9
| 91328 ||  || — || April 12, 1999 || Kitt Peak || Spacewatch || — || align=right | 1.9 km || 
|-id=329 bgcolor=#fefefe
| 91329 ||  || — || April 9, 1999 || Anderson Mesa || LONEOS || — || align=right | 1.6 km || 
|-id=330 bgcolor=#fefefe
| 91330 ||  || — || April 20, 1999 || Kleť || Kleť Obs. || FLO || align=right | 1.7 km || 
|-id=331 bgcolor=#fefefe
| 91331 ||  || — || April 17, 1999 || Kitt Peak || Spacewatch || FLO || align=right | 1.4 km || 
|-id=332 bgcolor=#fefefe
| 91332 ||  || — || April 17, 1999 || Socorro || LINEAR || V || align=right | 1.7 km || 
|-id=333 bgcolor=#fefefe
| 91333 ||  || — || May 8, 1999 || Catalina || CSS || — || align=right | 3.6 km || 
|-id=334 bgcolor=#E9E9E9
| 91334 ||  || — || May 12, 1999 || Socorro || LINEAR || — || align=right | 2.5 km || 
|-id=335 bgcolor=#fefefe
| 91335 ||  || — || May 8, 1999 || Catalina || CSS || — || align=right | 2.8 km || 
|-id=336 bgcolor=#fefefe
| 91336 ||  || — || May 10, 1999 || Socorro || LINEAR || — || align=right | 4.4 km || 
|-id=337 bgcolor=#E9E9E9
| 91337 ||  || — || May 13, 1999 || Socorro || LINEAR || BRU || align=right | 5.2 km || 
|-id=338 bgcolor=#fefefe
| 91338 ||  || — || May 10, 1999 || Socorro || LINEAR || V || align=right | 2.4 km || 
|-id=339 bgcolor=#E9E9E9
| 91339 ||  || — || May 10, 1999 || Socorro || LINEAR || GERslow || align=right | 6.4 km || 
|-id=340 bgcolor=#fefefe
| 91340 ||  || — || May 10, 1999 || Socorro || LINEAR || NYS || align=right | 2.0 km || 
|-id=341 bgcolor=#E9E9E9
| 91341 ||  || — || May 10, 1999 || Socorro || LINEAR || — || align=right | 2.1 km || 
|-id=342 bgcolor=#fefefe
| 91342 ||  || — || May 10, 1999 || Socorro || LINEAR || V || align=right | 1.6 km || 
|-id=343 bgcolor=#fefefe
| 91343 ||  || — || May 10, 1999 || Socorro || LINEAR || V || align=right | 2.5 km || 
|-id=344 bgcolor=#E9E9E9
| 91344 ||  || — || May 10, 1999 || Socorro || LINEAR || — || align=right | 1.6 km || 
|-id=345 bgcolor=#fefefe
| 91345 ||  || — || May 10, 1999 || Socorro || LINEAR || ERI || align=right | 5.6 km || 
|-id=346 bgcolor=#fefefe
| 91346 ||  || — || May 10, 1999 || Socorro || LINEAR || NYS || align=right | 2.0 km || 
|-id=347 bgcolor=#E9E9E9
| 91347 ||  || — || May 10, 1999 || Socorro || LINEAR || — || align=right | 3.4 km || 
|-id=348 bgcolor=#E9E9E9
| 91348 ||  || — || May 10, 1999 || Socorro || LINEAR || — || align=right | 2.8 km || 
|-id=349 bgcolor=#fefefe
| 91349 ||  || — || May 10, 1999 || Socorro || LINEAR || NYS || align=right | 1.5 km || 
|-id=350 bgcolor=#fefefe
| 91350 ||  || — || May 10, 1999 || Socorro || LINEAR || — || align=right | 1.9 km || 
|-id=351 bgcolor=#E9E9E9
| 91351 ||  || — || May 10, 1999 || Socorro || LINEAR || — || align=right | 4.1 km || 
|-id=352 bgcolor=#E9E9E9
| 91352 ||  || — || May 10, 1999 || Socorro || LINEAR || — || align=right | 5.6 km || 
|-id=353 bgcolor=#fefefe
| 91353 ||  || — || May 10, 1999 || Socorro || LINEAR || — || align=right | 2.9 km || 
|-id=354 bgcolor=#E9E9E9
| 91354 ||  || — || May 10, 1999 || Socorro || LINEAR || RAF || align=right | 1.7 km || 
|-id=355 bgcolor=#fefefe
| 91355 ||  || — || May 10, 1999 || Socorro || LINEAR || — || align=right | 3.4 km || 
|-id=356 bgcolor=#fefefe
| 91356 ||  || — || May 10, 1999 || Socorro || LINEAR || — || align=right | 1.8 km || 
|-id=357 bgcolor=#E9E9E9
| 91357 ||  || — || May 10, 1999 || Socorro || LINEAR || — || align=right | 4.4 km || 
|-id=358 bgcolor=#E9E9E9
| 91358 ||  || — || May 12, 1999 || Socorro || LINEAR || — || align=right | 2.4 km || 
|-id=359 bgcolor=#E9E9E9
| 91359 ||  || — || May 12, 1999 || Socorro || LINEAR || — || align=right | 4.6 km || 
|-id=360 bgcolor=#fefefe
| 91360 ||  || — || May 12, 1999 || Socorro || LINEAR || V || align=right | 3.1 km || 
|-id=361 bgcolor=#E9E9E9
| 91361 ||  || — || May 12, 1999 || Socorro || LINEAR || — || align=right | 2.2 km || 
|-id=362 bgcolor=#E9E9E9
| 91362 ||  || — || May 12, 1999 || Socorro || LINEAR || — || align=right | 5.0 km || 
|-id=363 bgcolor=#E9E9E9
| 91363 ||  || — || May 12, 1999 || Socorro || LINEAR || — || align=right | 1.9 km || 
|-id=364 bgcolor=#fefefe
| 91364 ||  || — || May 13, 1999 || Socorro || LINEAR || — || align=right | 2.4 km || 
|-id=365 bgcolor=#E9E9E9
| 91365 ||  || — || May 12, 1999 || Socorro || LINEAR || — || align=right | 3.1 km || 
|-id=366 bgcolor=#E9E9E9
| 91366 ||  || — || May 12, 1999 || Socorro || LINEAR || — || align=right | 4.2 km || 
|-id=367 bgcolor=#fefefe
| 91367 ||  || — || May 12, 1999 || Socorro || LINEAR || — || align=right | 3.5 km || 
|-id=368 bgcolor=#E9E9E9
| 91368 ||  || — || May 12, 1999 || Socorro || LINEAR || — || align=right | 5.9 km || 
|-id=369 bgcolor=#E9E9E9
| 91369 ||  || — || May 12, 1999 || Socorro || LINEAR || EUN || align=right | 2.2 km || 
|-id=370 bgcolor=#E9E9E9
| 91370 ||  || — || May 12, 1999 || Socorro || LINEAR || — || align=right | 2.2 km || 
|-id=371 bgcolor=#E9E9E9
| 91371 ||  || — || May 12, 1999 || Socorro || LINEAR || — || align=right | 3.4 km || 
|-id=372 bgcolor=#E9E9E9
| 91372 ||  || — || May 12, 1999 || Socorro || LINEAR || — || align=right | 2.4 km || 
|-id=373 bgcolor=#E9E9E9
| 91373 ||  || — || May 12, 1999 || Socorro || LINEAR || ADE || align=right | 4.3 km || 
|-id=374 bgcolor=#E9E9E9
| 91374 ||  || — || May 12, 1999 || Socorro || LINEAR || — || align=right | 2.7 km || 
|-id=375 bgcolor=#fefefe
| 91375 ||  || — || May 12, 1999 || Socorro || LINEAR || — || align=right | 3.1 km || 
|-id=376 bgcolor=#E9E9E9
| 91376 ||  || — || May 12, 1999 || Socorro || LINEAR || — || align=right | 4.1 km || 
|-id=377 bgcolor=#fefefe
| 91377 ||  || — || May 13, 1999 || Socorro || LINEAR || — || align=right | 2.3 km || 
|-id=378 bgcolor=#E9E9E9
| 91378 ||  || — || May 14, 1999 || Socorro || LINEAR || MAR || align=right | 1.9 km || 
|-id=379 bgcolor=#E9E9E9
| 91379 ||  || — || May 13, 1999 || Socorro || LINEAR || — || align=right | 1.9 km || 
|-id=380 bgcolor=#E9E9E9
| 91380 ||  || — || May 13, 1999 || Socorro || LINEAR || — || align=right | 2.0 km || 
|-id=381 bgcolor=#E9E9E9
| 91381 ||  || — || May 13, 1999 || Socorro || LINEAR || — || align=right | 9.7 km || 
|-id=382 bgcolor=#fefefe
| 91382 ||  || — || May 13, 1999 || Socorro || LINEAR || V || align=right | 1.5 km || 
|-id=383 bgcolor=#fefefe
| 91383 ||  || — || May 13, 1999 || Socorro || LINEAR || — || align=right | 1.7 km || 
|-id=384 bgcolor=#fefefe
| 91384 ||  || — || May 13, 1999 || Socorro || LINEAR || V || align=right | 1.8 km || 
|-id=385 bgcolor=#fefefe
| 91385 ||  || — || May 13, 1999 || Socorro || LINEAR || NYS || align=right | 1.5 km || 
|-id=386 bgcolor=#E9E9E9
| 91386 ||  || — || May 13, 1999 || Socorro || LINEAR || — || align=right | 3.2 km || 
|-id=387 bgcolor=#E9E9E9
| 91387 ||  || — || May 12, 1999 || Socorro || LINEAR || ADE || align=right | 5.8 km || 
|-id=388 bgcolor=#fefefe
| 91388 ||  || — || May 13, 1999 || Socorro || LINEAR || CIM || align=right | 4.6 km || 
|-id=389 bgcolor=#E9E9E9
| 91389 ||  || — || May 9, 1999 || Catalina || CSS || — || align=right | 2.5 km || 
|-id=390 bgcolor=#E9E9E9
| 91390 || 1999 KL || — || May 16, 1999 || Kitt Peak || Spacewatch || — || align=right | 2.4 km || 
|-id=391 bgcolor=#E9E9E9
| 91391 ||  || — || May 16, 1999 || Bergisch Gladbach || W. Bickel || — || align=right | 2.4 km || 
|-id=392 bgcolor=#E9E9E9
| 91392 ||  || — || May 18, 1999 || Socorro || LINEAR || GER || align=right | 3.6 km || 
|-id=393 bgcolor=#fefefe
| 91393 ||  || — || May 18, 1999 || Socorro || LINEAR || — || align=right | 4.6 km || 
|-id=394 bgcolor=#E9E9E9
| 91394 || 1999 LM || — || June 6, 1999 || Prescott || P. G. Comba || — || align=right | 3.0 km || 
|-id=395 bgcolor=#E9E9E9
| 91395 Sakanouenokumo ||  ||  || June 5, 1999 || Kuma Kogen || A. Nakamura || — || align=right | 3.5 km || 
|-id=396 bgcolor=#E9E9E9
| 91396 ||  || — || June 10, 1999 || Socorro || LINEAR || MAR || align=right | 2.9 km || 
|-id=397 bgcolor=#E9E9E9
| 91397 ||  || — || June 8, 1999 || Socorro || LINEAR || — || align=right | 2.8 km || 
|-id=398 bgcolor=#E9E9E9
| 91398 ||  || — || June 11, 1999 || Catalina || CSS || EUN || align=right | 3.0 km || 
|-id=399 bgcolor=#E9E9E9
| 91399 ||  || — || June 8, 1999 || Catalina || CSS || PAL || align=right | 3.9 km || 
|-id=400 bgcolor=#E9E9E9
| 91400 || 1999 MW || — || June 23, 1999 || Farra d'Isonzo || Farra d'Isonzo || — || align=right | 3.5 km || 
|}

91401–91500 

|-bgcolor=#E9E9E9
| 91401 || 1999 MY || — || June 22, 1999 || Woomera || F. B. Zoltowski || — || align=right | 3.5 km || 
|-id=402 bgcolor=#E9E9E9
| 91402 || 1999 NW || — || July 9, 1999 || Woomera || F. B. Zoltowski || — || align=right | 4.4 km || 
|-id=403 bgcolor=#E9E9E9
| 91403 ||  || — || July 13, 1999 || Socorro || LINEAR || — || align=right | 4.3 km || 
|-id=404 bgcolor=#E9E9E9
| 91404 ||  || — || July 13, 1999 || Socorro || LINEAR || — || align=right | 4.9 km || 
|-id=405 bgcolor=#E9E9E9
| 91405 ||  || — || July 13, 1999 || Socorro || LINEAR || GER || align=right | 4.3 km || 
|-id=406 bgcolor=#E9E9E9
| 91406 ||  || — || July 13, 1999 || Socorro || LINEAR || EUN || align=right | 5.5 km || 
|-id=407 bgcolor=#E9E9E9
| 91407 ||  || — || July 13, 1999 || Socorro || LINEAR || — || align=right | 4.3 km || 
|-id=408 bgcolor=#E9E9E9
| 91408 ||  || — || July 13, 1999 || Socorro || LINEAR || EUN || align=right | 4.5 km || 
|-id=409 bgcolor=#E9E9E9
| 91409 ||  || — || July 14, 1999 || Socorro || LINEAR || — || align=right | 3.6 km || 
|-id=410 bgcolor=#E9E9E9
| 91410 ||  || — || July 14, 1999 || Socorro || LINEAR || — || align=right | 6.9 km || 
|-id=411 bgcolor=#E9E9E9
| 91411 ||  || — || July 14, 1999 || Socorro || LINEAR || — || align=right | 4.0 km || 
|-id=412 bgcolor=#E9E9E9
| 91412 ||  || — || July 14, 1999 || Socorro || LINEAR || — || align=right | 6.4 km || 
|-id=413 bgcolor=#E9E9E9
| 91413 ||  || — || July 13, 1999 || Socorro || LINEAR || — || align=right | 5.9 km || 
|-id=414 bgcolor=#E9E9E9
| 91414 ||  || — || July 12, 1999 || Socorro || LINEAR || EUN || align=right | 3.3 km || 
|-id=415 bgcolor=#E9E9E9
| 91415 ||  || — || July 12, 1999 || Socorro || LINEAR || — || align=right | 4.1 km || 
|-id=416 bgcolor=#E9E9E9
| 91416 ||  || — || July 12, 1999 || Socorro || LINEAR || EUN || align=right | 3.4 km || 
|-id=417 bgcolor=#E9E9E9
| 91417 ||  || — || July 12, 1999 || Socorro || LINEAR || ADE || align=right | 7.4 km || 
|-id=418 bgcolor=#E9E9E9
| 91418 ||  || — || July 12, 1999 || Socorro || LINEAR || — || align=right | 4.2 km || 
|-id=419 bgcolor=#E9E9E9
| 91419 ||  || — || July 13, 1999 || Socorro || LINEAR || — || align=right | 4.3 km || 
|-id=420 bgcolor=#E9E9E9
| 91420 ||  || — || July 13, 1999 || Socorro || LINEAR || — || align=right | 5.2 km || 
|-id=421 bgcolor=#E9E9E9
| 91421 ||  || — || July 14, 1999 || Socorro || LINEAR || — || align=right | 3.8 km || 
|-id=422 bgcolor=#E9E9E9
| 91422 Giraudon || 1999 OH ||  || July 16, 1999 || Pises || Pises Obs. || ADE || align=right | 8.3 km || 
|-id=423 bgcolor=#E9E9E9
| 91423 ||  || — || July 16, 1999 || Socorro || LINEAR || — || align=right | 3.4 km || 
|-id=424 bgcolor=#E9E9E9
| 91424 ||  || — || August 10, 1999 || Ametlla de Mar || J. Nomen || — || align=right | 5.7 km || 
|-id=425 bgcolor=#d6d6d6
| 91425 ||  || — || August 7, 1999 || Kitt Peak || Spacewatch || KOR || align=right | 3.1 km || 
|-id=426 bgcolor=#d6d6d6
| 91426 ||  || — || August 13, 1999 || Reedy Creek || J. Broughton || — || align=right | 4.4 km || 
|-id=427 bgcolor=#d6d6d6
| 91427 ||  || — || August 14, 1999 || Ondřejov || P. Kušnirák, P. Pravec || — || align=right | 6.1 km || 
|-id=428 bgcolor=#E9E9E9
| 91428 Cortesi ||  ||  || August 20, 1999 || Gnosca || S. Sposetti || EUN || align=right | 3.8 km || 
|-id=429 bgcolor=#E9E9E9
| 91429 Michelebianda ||  ||  || August 30, 1999 || Gnosca || S. Sposetti || — || align=right | 3.4 km || 
|-id=430 bgcolor=#d6d6d6
| 91430 || 1999 RL || — || September 4, 1999 || Prescott || P. G. Comba || — || align=right | 6.4 km || 
|-id=431 bgcolor=#E9E9E9
| 91431 || 1999 RQ || — || September 3, 1999 || Ondřejov || L. Kotková || AGN || align=right | 2.2 km || 
|-id=432 bgcolor=#E9E9E9
| 91432 ||  || — || September 4, 1999 || Prescott || P. G. Comba || HOF || align=right | 6.3 km || 
|-id=433 bgcolor=#E9E9E9
| 91433 ||  || — || September 4, 1999 || Catalina || CSS || — || align=right | 6.2 km || 
|-id=434 bgcolor=#E9E9E9
| 91434 ||  || — || September 4, 1999 || Catalina || CSS || — || align=right | 4.6 km || 
|-id=435 bgcolor=#d6d6d6
| 91435 ||  || — || September 3, 1999 || Kitt Peak || Spacewatch || EOS || align=right | 3.8 km || 
|-id=436 bgcolor=#d6d6d6
| 91436 ||  || — || September 3, 1999 || Kitt Peak || Spacewatch || — || align=right | 4.4 km || 
|-id=437 bgcolor=#d6d6d6
| 91437 ||  || — || September 4, 1999 || Kitt Peak || Spacewatch || — || align=right | 5.6 km || 
|-id=438 bgcolor=#E9E9E9
| 91438 ||  || — || September 7, 1999 || Socorro || LINEAR || — || align=right | 2.9 km || 
|-id=439 bgcolor=#E9E9E9
| 91439 ||  || — || September 7, 1999 || Socorro || LINEAR || — || align=right | 4.6 km || 
|-id=440 bgcolor=#E9E9E9
| 91440 ||  || — || September 7, 1999 || Socorro || LINEAR || — || align=right | 6.0 km || 
|-id=441 bgcolor=#d6d6d6
| 91441 ||  || — || September 7, 1999 || Socorro || LINEAR || EOS || align=right | 5.2 km || 
|-id=442 bgcolor=#E9E9E9
| 91442 ||  || — || September 7, 1999 || Socorro || LINEAR || DOR || align=right | 4.0 km || 
|-id=443 bgcolor=#E9E9E9
| 91443 ||  || — || September 7, 1999 || Socorro || LINEAR || — || align=right | 3.3 km || 
|-id=444 bgcolor=#d6d6d6
| 91444 ||  || — || September 7, 1999 || Socorro || LINEAR || — || align=right | 3.4 km || 
|-id=445 bgcolor=#d6d6d6
| 91445 ||  || — || September 7, 1999 || Socorro || LINEAR || — || align=right | 4.8 km || 
|-id=446 bgcolor=#E9E9E9
| 91446 ||  || — || September 7, 1999 || Socorro || LINEAR || — || align=right | 6.0 km || 
|-id=447 bgcolor=#E9E9E9
| 91447 ||  || — || September 7, 1999 || Socorro || LINEAR || — || align=right | 3.6 km || 
|-id=448 bgcolor=#E9E9E9
| 91448 ||  || — || September 7, 1999 || Socorro || LINEAR || — || align=right | 3.3 km || 
|-id=449 bgcolor=#d6d6d6
| 91449 ||  || — || September 7, 1999 || Socorro || LINEAR || EOS || align=right | 4.6 km || 
|-id=450 bgcolor=#fefefe
| 91450 ||  || — || September 7, 1999 || Socorro || LINEAR || H || align=right | 2.0 km || 
|-id=451 bgcolor=#d6d6d6
| 91451 ||  || — || September 13, 1999 || Višnjan Observatory || K. Korlević || — || align=right | 5.1 km || 
|-id=452 bgcolor=#d6d6d6
| 91452 ||  || — || September 14, 1999 || Ondřejov || P. Kušnirák, P. Pravec || EOS || align=right | 4.1 km || 
|-id=453 bgcolor=#E9E9E9
| 91453 ||  || — || September 7, 1999 || Socorro || LINEAR || — || align=right | 5.4 km || 
|-id=454 bgcolor=#E9E9E9
| 91454 ||  || — || September 7, 1999 || Socorro || LINEAR || EUN || align=right | 2.9 km || 
|-id=455 bgcolor=#E9E9E9
| 91455 ||  || — || September 7, 1999 || Socorro || LINEAR || EUN || align=right | 3.5 km || 
|-id=456 bgcolor=#E9E9E9
| 91456 ||  || — || September 7, 1999 || Socorro || LINEAR || — || align=right | 6.6 km || 
|-id=457 bgcolor=#E9E9E9
| 91457 ||  || — || September 7, 1999 || Socorro || LINEAR || AGN || align=right | 2.3 km || 
|-id=458 bgcolor=#d6d6d6
| 91458 ||  || — || September 7, 1999 || Socorro || LINEAR || KOR || align=right | 3.5 km || 
|-id=459 bgcolor=#E9E9E9
| 91459 ||  || — || September 7, 1999 || Socorro || LINEAR || — || align=right | 2.8 km || 
|-id=460 bgcolor=#E9E9E9
| 91460 ||  || — || September 7, 1999 || Socorro || LINEAR || — || align=right | 4.9 km || 
|-id=461 bgcolor=#E9E9E9
| 91461 ||  || — || September 7, 1999 || Socorro || LINEAR || AGN || align=right | 2.2 km || 
|-id=462 bgcolor=#E9E9E9
| 91462 ||  || — || September 7, 1999 || Socorro || LINEAR || — || align=right | 5.1 km || 
|-id=463 bgcolor=#d6d6d6
| 91463 ||  || — || September 7, 1999 || Socorro || LINEAR || EOS || align=right | 3.5 km || 
|-id=464 bgcolor=#d6d6d6
| 91464 ||  || — || September 7, 1999 || Socorro || LINEAR || — || align=right | 5.5 km || 
|-id=465 bgcolor=#d6d6d6
| 91465 ||  || — || September 7, 1999 || Socorro || LINEAR || FIR || align=right | 4.3 km || 
|-id=466 bgcolor=#E9E9E9
| 91466 ||  || — || September 7, 1999 || Socorro || LINEAR || DOR || align=right | 6.6 km || 
|-id=467 bgcolor=#E9E9E9
| 91467 ||  || — || September 7, 1999 || Socorro || LINEAR || — || align=right | 6.4 km || 
|-id=468 bgcolor=#E9E9E9
| 91468 ||  || — || September 7, 1999 || Socorro || LINEAR || — || align=right | 4.9 km || 
|-id=469 bgcolor=#d6d6d6
| 91469 ||  || — || September 7, 1999 || Socorro || LINEAR || KOR || align=right | 4.7 km || 
|-id=470 bgcolor=#E9E9E9
| 91470 ||  || — || September 7, 1999 || Socorro || LINEAR || HOF || align=right | 6.8 km || 
|-id=471 bgcolor=#d6d6d6
| 91471 ||  || — || September 7, 1999 || Socorro || LINEAR || EOS || align=right | 4.8 km || 
|-id=472 bgcolor=#d6d6d6
| 91472 ||  || — || September 7, 1999 || Socorro || LINEAR || — || align=right | 4.2 km || 
|-id=473 bgcolor=#d6d6d6
| 91473 ||  || — || September 7, 1999 || Socorro || LINEAR || — || align=right | 5.7 km || 
|-id=474 bgcolor=#E9E9E9
| 91474 ||  || — || September 7, 1999 || Socorro || LINEAR || HNA || align=right | 5.4 km || 
|-id=475 bgcolor=#d6d6d6
| 91475 ||  || — || September 7, 1999 || Socorro || LINEAR || — || align=right | 4.7 km || 
|-id=476 bgcolor=#E9E9E9
| 91476 ||  || — || September 7, 1999 || Socorro || LINEAR || — || align=right | 4.3 km || 
|-id=477 bgcolor=#d6d6d6
| 91477 ||  || — || September 7, 1999 || Socorro || LINEAR || — || align=right | 5.8 km || 
|-id=478 bgcolor=#E9E9E9
| 91478 ||  || — || September 8, 1999 || Socorro || LINEAR || — || align=right | 2.7 km || 
|-id=479 bgcolor=#d6d6d6
| 91479 ||  || — || September 8, 1999 || Socorro || LINEAR || — || align=right | 8.2 km || 
|-id=480 bgcolor=#d6d6d6
| 91480 ||  || — || September 8, 1999 || Socorro || LINEAR || — || align=right | 8.9 km || 
|-id=481 bgcolor=#E9E9E9
| 91481 ||  || — || September 8, 1999 || Socorro || LINEAR || — || align=right | 4.4 km || 
|-id=482 bgcolor=#d6d6d6
| 91482 ||  || — || September 8, 1999 || Socorro || LINEAR || — || align=right | 7.6 km || 
|-id=483 bgcolor=#d6d6d6
| 91483 ||  || — || September 8, 1999 || Socorro || LINEAR || — || align=right | 6.7 km || 
|-id=484 bgcolor=#E9E9E9
| 91484 ||  || — || September 9, 1999 || Socorro || LINEAR || — || align=right | 3.8 km || 
|-id=485 bgcolor=#E9E9E9
| 91485 ||  || — || September 9, 1999 || Socorro || LINEAR || — || align=right | 4.7 km || 
|-id=486 bgcolor=#E9E9E9
| 91486 ||  || — || September 9, 1999 || Socorro || LINEAR || — || align=right | 5.5 km || 
|-id=487 bgcolor=#E9E9E9
| 91487 ||  || — || September 9, 1999 || Socorro || LINEAR || MAR || align=right | 5.3 km || 
|-id=488 bgcolor=#E9E9E9
| 91488 ||  || — || September 9, 1999 || Socorro || LINEAR || — || align=right | 7.7 km || 
|-id=489 bgcolor=#d6d6d6
| 91489 ||  || — || September 9, 1999 || Socorro || LINEAR || EOS || align=right | 3.0 km || 
|-id=490 bgcolor=#E9E9E9
| 91490 ||  || — || September 9, 1999 || Socorro || LINEAR || — || align=right | 3.7 km || 
|-id=491 bgcolor=#E9E9E9
| 91491 ||  || — || September 9, 1999 || Socorro || LINEAR || — || align=right | 5.3 km || 
|-id=492 bgcolor=#E9E9E9
| 91492 ||  || — || September 9, 1999 || Socorro || LINEAR || — || align=right | 3.4 km || 
|-id=493 bgcolor=#E9E9E9
| 91493 ||  || — || September 9, 1999 || Socorro || LINEAR || — || align=right | 4.1 km || 
|-id=494 bgcolor=#E9E9E9
| 91494 ||  || — || September 9, 1999 || Socorro || LINEAR || — || align=right | 4.5 km || 
|-id=495 bgcolor=#E9E9E9
| 91495 ||  || — || September 9, 1999 || Socorro || LINEAR || — || align=right | 6.1 km || 
|-id=496 bgcolor=#E9E9E9
| 91496 ||  || — || September 9, 1999 || Socorro || LINEAR || — || align=right | 3.8 km || 
|-id=497 bgcolor=#d6d6d6
| 91497 ||  || — || September 9, 1999 || Socorro || LINEAR || — || align=right | 5.5 km || 
|-id=498 bgcolor=#d6d6d6
| 91498 ||  || — || September 9, 1999 || Socorro || LINEAR || — || align=right | 3.5 km || 
|-id=499 bgcolor=#E9E9E9
| 91499 ||  || — || September 9, 1999 || Socorro || LINEAR || CLO || align=right | 5.5 km || 
|-id=500 bgcolor=#d6d6d6
| 91500 ||  || — || September 9, 1999 || Socorro || LINEAR || — || align=right | 5.3 km || 
|}

91501–91600 

|-bgcolor=#E9E9E9
| 91501 ||  || — || September 9, 1999 || Socorro || LINEAR || DOR || align=right | 4.6 km || 
|-id=502 bgcolor=#E9E9E9
| 91502 ||  || — || September 9, 1999 || Socorro || LINEAR || EUN || align=right | 3.9 km || 
|-id=503 bgcolor=#E9E9E9
| 91503 ||  || — || September 9, 1999 || Socorro || LINEAR || PAE || align=right | 5.8 km || 
|-id=504 bgcolor=#E9E9E9
| 91504 ||  || — || September 9, 1999 || Socorro || LINEAR || AER || align=right | 3.3 km || 
|-id=505 bgcolor=#E9E9E9
| 91505 ||  || — || September 9, 1999 || Socorro || LINEAR || EUN || align=right | 4.6 km || 
|-id=506 bgcolor=#E9E9E9
| 91506 ||  || — || September 9, 1999 || Socorro || LINEAR || — || align=right | 5.3 km || 
|-id=507 bgcolor=#E9E9E9
| 91507 ||  || — || September 9, 1999 || Socorro || LINEAR || — || align=right | 7.4 km || 
|-id=508 bgcolor=#d6d6d6
| 91508 ||  || — || September 9, 1999 || Socorro || LINEAR || KOR || align=right | 2.9 km || 
|-id=509 bgcolor=#d6d6d6
| 91509 ||  || — || September 9, 1999 || Socorro || LINEAR || — || align=right | 4.8 km || 
|-id=510 bgcolor=#E9E9E9
| 91510 ||  || — || September 9, 1999 || Socorro || LINEAR || CLO || align=right | 4.5 km || 
|-id=511 bgcolor=#d6d6d6
| 91511 ||  || — || September 9, 1999 || Socorro || LINEAR || — || align=right | 8.4 km || 
|-id=512 bgcolor=#E9E9E9
| 91512 ||  || — || September 9, 1999 || Socorro || LINEAR || — || align=right | 3.4 km || 
|-id=513 bgcolor=#E9E9E9
| 91513 ||  || — || September 9, 1999 || Socorro || LINEAR || — || align=right | 2.8 km || 
|-id=514 bgcolor=#d6d6d6
| 91514 ||  || — || September 9, 1999 || Socorro || LINEAR || KOR || align=right | 3.7 km || 
|-id=515 bgcolor=#E9E9E9
| 91515 ||  || — || September 9, 1999 || Socorro || LINEAR || HOF || align=right | 6.7 km || 
|-id=516 bgcolor=#E9E9E9
| 91516 ||  || — || September 9, 1999 || Socorro || LINEAR || — || align=right | 5.6 km || 
|-id=517 bgcolor=#E9E9E9
| 91517 ||  || — || September 9, 1999 || Socorro || LINEAR || — || align=right | 5.1 km || 
|-id=518 bgcolor=#d6d6d6
| 91518 ||  || — || September 9, 1999 || Socorro || LINEAR || — || align=right | 4.7 km || 
|-id=519 bgcolor=#E9E9E9
| 91519 ||  || — || September 9, 1999 || Socorro || LINEAR || — || align=right | 5.0 km || 
|-id=520 bgcolor=#d6d6d6
| 91520 ||  || — || September 9, 1999 || Socorro || LINEAR || KOR || align=right | 4.8 km || 
|-id=521 bgcolor=#d6d6d6
| 91521 ||  || — || September 9, 1999 || Socorro || LINEAR || — || align=right | 5.5 km || 
|-id=522 bgcolor=#E9E9E9
| 91522 ||  || — || September 9, 1999 || Socorro || LINEAR || HNS || align=right | 4.0 km || 
|-id=523 bgcolor=#E9E9E9
| 91523 ||  || — || September 9, 1999 || Socorro || LINEAR || — || align=right | 3.4 km || 
|-id=524 bgcolor=#E9E9E9
| 91524 ||  || — || September 9, 1999 || Socorro || LINEAR || — || align=right | 6.9 km || 
|-id=525 bgcolor=#d6d6d6
| 91525 ||  || — || September 9, 1999 || Socorro || LINEAR || EOS || align=right | 4.0 km || 
|-id=526 bgcolor=#d6d6d6
| 91526 ||  || — || September 9, 1999 || Socorro || LINEAR || — || align=right | 3.9 km || 
|-id=527 bgcolor=#d6d6d6
| 91527 ||  || — || September 9, 1999 || Socorro || LINEAR || 628 || align=right | 4.5 km || 
|-id=528 bgcolor=#E9E9E9
| 91528 ||  || — || September 11, 1999 || Socorro || LINEAR || GAL || align=right | 4.3 km || 
|-id=529 bgcolor=#d6d6d6
| 91529 ||  || — || September 13, 1999 || Farpoint || G. Hug, G. Bell || — || align=right | 3.1 km || 
|-id=530 bgcolor=#d6d6d6
| 91530 ||  || — || September 7, 1999 || Socorro || LINEAR || YAK || align=right | 6.1 km || 
|-id=531 bgcolor=#d6d6d6
| 91531 ||  || — || September 8, 1999 || Socorro || LINEAR || — || align=right | 5.8 km || 
|-id=532 bgcolor=#E9E9E9
| 91532 ||  || — || September 8, 1999 || Socorro || LINEAR || — || align=right | 5.6 km || 
|-id=533 bgcolor=#E9E9E9
| 91533 ||  || — || September 8, 1999 || Socorro || LINEAR || — || align=right | 5.0 km || 
|-id=534 bgcolor=#d6d6d6
| 91534 ||  || — || September 8, 1999 || Socorro || LINEAR || — || align=right | 7.2 km || 
|-id=535 bgcolor=#E9E9E9
| 91535 ||  || — || September 8, 1999 || Socorro || LINEAR || — || align=right | 4.1 km || 
|-id=536 bgcolor=#d6d6d6
| 91536 ||  || — || September 8, 1999 || Socorro || LINEAR || — || align=right | 8.3 km || 
|-id=537 bgcolor=#d6d6d6
| 91537 ||  || — || September 8, 1999 || Socorro || LINEAR || EOS || align=right | 5.6 km || 
|-id=538 bgcolor=#E9E9E9
| 91538 ||  || — || September 8, 1999 || Socorro || LINEAR || BRU || align=right | 10 km || 
|-id=539 bgcolor=#d6d6d6
| 91539 ||  || — || September 8, 1999 || Socorro || LINEAR || EOS || align=right | 4.6 km || 
|-id=540 bgcolor=#E9E9E9
| 91540 ||  || — || September 8, 1999 || Socorro || LINEAR || — || align=right | 6.2 km || 
|-id=541 bgcolor=#E9E9E9
| 91541 ||  || — || September 8, 1999 || Socorro || LINEAR || GEF || align=right | 2.9 km || 
|-id=542 bgcolor=#d6d6d6
| 91542 ||  || — || September 8, 1999 || Socorro || LINEAR || — || align=right | 8.1 km || 
|-id=543 bgcolor=#d6d6d6
| 91543 ||  || — || September 8, 1999 || Socorro || LINEAR || — || align=right | 8.0 km || 
|-id=544 bgcolor=#d6d6d6
| 91544 ||  || — || September 8, 1999 || Socorro || LINEAR || — || align=right | 5.7 km || 
|-id=545 bgcolor=#d6d6d6
| 91545 ||  || — || September 8, 1999 || Socorro || LINEAR || EOS || align=right | 6.2 km || 
|-id=546 bgcolor=#d6d6d6
| 91546 ||  || — || September 8, 1999 || Socorro || LINEAR || EOS || align=right | 5.2 km || 
|-id=547 bgcolor=#d6d6d6
| 91547 ||  || — || September 8, 1999 || Socorro || LINEAR || — || align=right | 7.4 km || 
|-id=548 bgcolor=#E9E9E9
| 91548 ||  || — || September 8, 1999 || Socorro || LINEAR || — || align=right | 3.6 km || 
|-id=549 bgcolor=#d6d6d6
| 91549 ||  || — || September 8, 1999 || Socorro || LINEAR || 627 || align=right | 8.4 km || 
|-id=550 bgcolor=#d6d6d6
| 91550 ||  || — || September 8, 1999 || Socorro || LINEAR || — || align=right | 7.7 km || 
|-id=551 bgcolor=#d6d6d6
| 91551 ||  || — || September 8, 1999 || Socorro || LINEAR || — || align=right | 10 km || 
|-id=552 bgcolor=#d6d6d6
| 91552 ||  || — || September 8, 1999 || Bergisch Gladbach || W. Bickel || — || align=right | 3.5 km || 
|-id=553 bgcolor=#d6d6d6
| 91553 Claudedoom ||  ||  || September 8, 1999 || Observatoire Royal de Belgique, Uccle || T. Pauwels || KOR || align=right | 2.2 km || 
|-id=554 bgcolor=#C2E0FF
| 91554 ||  || — || September 8, 1999 || Mauna Kea || J. X. Luu, C. Trujillo, D. C. Jewitt || SDO || align=right | 122 km || 
|-id=555 bgcolor=#d6d6d6
| 91555 ||  || — || September 5, 1999 || Kitt Peak || Spacewatch || KOR || align=right | 3.1 km || 
|-id=556 bgcolor=#E9E9E9
| 91556 ||  || — || September 5, 1999 || Catalina || CSS || — || align=right | 5.5 km || 
|-id=557 bgcolor=#E9E9E9
| 91557 ||  || — || September 7, 1999 || Catalina || CSS || GEF || align=right | 2.7 km || 
|-id=558 bgcolor=#d6d6d6
| 91558 ||  || — || September 4, 1999 || Catalina || CSS || — || align=right | 5.8 km || 
|-id=559 bgcolor=#E9E9E9
| 91559 ||  || — || September 4, 1999 || Kitt Peak || Spacewatch || — || align=right | 2.2 km || 
|-id=560 bgcolor=#d6d6d6
| 91560 ||  || — || September 5, 1999 || Catalina || CSS || — || align=right | 5.5 km || 
|-id=561 bgcolor=#E9E9E9
| 91561 ||  || — || September 8, 1999 || Catalina || CSS || — || align=right | 5.5 km || 
|-id=562 bgcolor=#E9E9E9
| 91562 ||  || — || September 9, 1999 || Anderson Mesa || LONEOS || — || align=right | 4.0 km || 
|-id=563 bgcolor=#d6d6d6
| 91563 ||  || — || September 8, 1999 || Catalina || CSS || EMA || align=right | 5.6 km || 
|-id=564 bgcolor=#d6d6d6
| 91564 ||  || — || September 8, 1999 || Socorro || LINEAR || — || align=right | 6.2 km || 
|-id=565 bgcolor=#d6d6d6
| 91565 ||  || — || September 8, 1999 || Catalina || CSS || EOS || align=right | 4.6 km || 
|-id=566 bgcolor=#d6d6d6
| 91566 ||  || — || September 8, 1999 || Catalina || CSS || EOS || align=right | 4.6 km || 
|-id=567 bgcolor=#d6d6d6
| 91567 ||  || — || September 8, 1999 || Anderson Mesa || LONEOS || — || align=right | 7.8 km || 
|-id=568 bgcolor=#d6d6d6
| 91568 ||  || — || September 11, 1999 || Anderson Mesa || LONEOS || LIX || align=right | 8.4 km || 
|-id=569 bgcolor=#E9E9E9
| 91569 ||  || — || September 7, 1999 || Socorro || LINEAR || GEF || align=right | 3.2 km || 
|-id=570 bgcolor=#d6d6d6
| 91570 ||  || — || September 8, 1999 || Socorro || LINEAR || EOS || align=right | 4.1 km || 
|-id=571 bgcolor=#d6d6d6
| 91571 ||  || — || September 8, 1999 || Socorro || LINEAR || — || align=right | 3.6 km || 
|-id=572 bgcolor=#d6d6d6
| 91572 ||  || — || September 8, 1999 || Socorro || LINEAR || — || align=right | 7.3 km || 
|-id=573 bgcolor=#E9E9E9
| 91573 ||  || — || September 16, 1999 || Observatoire Royal de Belgique, Uccle || T. Pauwels, S. I. Ipatov || — || align=right | 2.6 km || 
|-id=574 bgcolor=#d6d6d6
| 91574 ||  || — || September 22, 1999 || Ondřejov || L. Kotková || EOS || align=right | 4.5 km || 
|-id=575 bgcolor=#d6d6d6
| 91575 ||  || — || September 30, 1999 || Socorro || LINEAR || EOS || align=right | 5.3 km || 
|-id=576 bgcolor=#E9E9E9
| 91576 ||  || — || September 29, 1999 || Socorro || LINEAR || — || align=right | 5.7 km || 
|-id=577 bgcolor=#E9E9E9
| 91577 ||  || — || September 29, 1999 || Socorro || LINEAR || — || align=right | 6.0 km || 
|-id=578 bgcolor=#d6d6d6
| 91578 ||  || — || September 30, 1999 || Catalina || CSS || KOR || align=right | 3.0 km || 
|-id=579 bgcolor=#d6d6d6
| 91579 ||  || — || September 30, 1999 || Catalina || CSS || EOS || align=right | 5.0 km || 
|-id=580 bgcolor=#d6d6d6
| 91580 ||  || — || September 30, 1999 || Catalina || CSS || — || align=right | 5.9 km || 
|-id=581 bgcolor=#d6d6d6
| 91581 ||  || — || September 30, 1999 || Catalina || CSS || — || align=right | 6.0 km || 
|-id=582 bgcolor=#d6d6d6
| 91582 ||  || — || September 30, 1999 || Socorro || LINEAR || — || align=right | 4.0 km || 
|-id=583 bgcolor=#d6d6d6
| 91583 ||  || — || September 30, 1999 || Socorro || LINEAR || — || align=right | 5.3 km || 
|-id=584 bgcolor=#E9E9E9
| 91584 ||  || — || September 30, 1999 || Socorro || LINEAR || — || align=right | 6.4 km || 
|-id=585 bgcolor=#E9E9E9
| 91585 ||  || — || September 30, 1999 || Socorro || LINEAR || GEF || align=right | 3.1 km || 
|-id=586 bgcolor=#d6d6d6
| 91586 ||  || — || September 30, 1999 || Kitt Peak || Spacewatch || — || align=right | 4.3 km || 
|-id=587 bgcolor=#d6d6d6
| 91587 ||  || — || September 29, 1999 || Catalina || CSS || EOS || align=right | 4.2 km || 
|-id=588 bgcolor=#d6d6d6
| 91588 || 1999 TJ || — || October 2, 1999 || Prescott || P. G. Comba || — || align=right | 4.4 km || 
|-id=589 bgcolor=#d6d6d6
| 91589 ||  || — || October 1, 1999 || Višnjan Observatory || K. Korlević || — || align=right | 5.9 km || 
|-id=590 bgcolor=#d6d6d6
| 91590 ||  || — || October 3, 1999 || Fountain Hills || C. W. Juels || EOS || align=right | 7.5 km || 
|-id=591 bgcolor=#d6d6d6
| 91591 ||  || — || October 4, 1999 || Prescott || P. G. Comba || — || align=right | 5.0 km || 
|-id=592 bgcolor=#d6d6d6
| 91592 ||  || — || October 2, 1999 || Ondřejov || L. Kotková || EOS || align=right | 6.2 km || 
|-id=593 bgcolor=#d6d6d6
| 91593 ||  || — || October 6, 1999 || Višnjan Observatory || K. Korlević, M. Jurić || — || align=right | 6.2 km || 
|-id=594 bgcolor=#d6d6d6
| 91594 ||  || — || October 6, 1999 || Višnjan Observatory || K. Korlević, M. Jurić || — || align=right | 5.7 km || 
|-id=595 bgcolor=#E9E9E9
| 91595 ||  || — || October 9, 1999 || Prescott || P. G. Comba || — || align=right | 2.3 km || 
|-id=596 bgcolor=#d6d6d6
| 91596 ||  || — || October 9, 1999 || Fountain Hills || C. W. Juels || — || align=right | 4.1 km || 
|-id=597 bgcolor=#E9E9E9
| 91597 ||  || — || October 10, 1999 || Oizumi || T. Kobayashi || — || align=right | 6.9 km || 
|-id=598 bgcolor=#d6d6d6
| 91598 ||  || — || October 11, 1999 || Lime Creek || R. Linderholm || — || align=right | 7.2 km || 
|-id=599 bgcolor=#d6d6d6
| 91599 ||  || — || October 10, 1999 || Črni Vrh || Črni Vrh || slow || align=right | 7.5 km || 
|-id=600 bgcolor=#d6d6d6
| 91600 ||  || — || October 13, 1999 || Ondřejov || P. Pravec, P. Kušnirák || KOR || align=right | 2.6 km || 
|}

91601–91700 

|-bgcolor=#d6d6d6
| 91601 ||  || — || October 10, 1999 || Višnjan Observatory || K. Korlević || — || align=right | 5.2 km || 
|-id=602 bgcolor=#d6d6d6
| 91602 ||  || — || October 13, 1999 || Modra || A. Galád, P. Kolény || EOS || align=right | 7.6 km || 
|-id=603 bgcolor=#d6d6d6
| 91603 ||  || — || October 15, 1999 || Višnjan Observatory || K. Korlević || — || align=right | 8.2 km || 
|-id=604 bgcolor=#d6d6d6
| 91604 Clausmadsen ||  ||  || October 14, 1999 || Uccle || T. Pauwels, H. Boffin || EOS || align=right | 4.8 km || 
|-id=605 bgcolor=#d6d6d6
| 91605 ||  || — || October 15, 1999 || Xinglong || SCAP || — || align=right | 8.8 km || 
|-id=606 bgcolor=#d6d6d6
| 91606 ||  || — || October 15, 1999 || Xinglong || SCAP || — || align=right | 5.9 km || 
|-id=607 bgcolor=#d6d6d6
| 91607 Delaboudiniere ||  ||  || October 5, 1999 || Goodricke-Pigott || R. A. Tucker || — || align=right | 5.4 km || 
|-id=608 bgcolor=#d6d6d6
| 91608 ||  || — || October 3, 1999 || Kitt Peak || Spacewatch || — || align=right | 5.4 km || 
|-id=609 bgcolor=#E9E9E9
| 91609 ||  || — || October 3, 1999 || Kitt Peak || Spacewatch || — || align=right | 4.8 km || 
|-id=610 bgcolor=#d6d6d6
| 91610 ||  || — || October 3, 1999 || Socorro || LINEAR || EOS || align=right | 5.0 km || 
|-id=611 bgcolor=#d6d6d6
| 91611 ||  || — || October 3, 1999 || Socorro || LINEAR || HYG || align=right | 7.8 km || 
|-id=612 bgcolor=#d6d6d6
| 91612 ||  || — || October 4, 1999 || Socorro || LINEAR || EMA || align=right | 5.6 km || 
|-id=613 bgcolor=#d6d6d6
| 91613 ||  || — || October 4, 1999 || Socorro || LINEAR || HYG || align=right | 11 km || 
|-id=614 bgcolor=#d6d6d6
| 91614 ||  || — || October 4, 1999 || Socorro || LINEAR || — || align=right | 5.1 km || 
|-id=615 bgcolor=#d6d6d6
| 91615 ||  || — || October 4, 1999 || Socorro || LINEAR || — || align=right | 6.2 km || 
|-id=616 bgcolor=#d6d6d6
| 91616 ||  || — || October 4, 1999 || Socorro || LINEAR || — || align=right | 5.3 km || 
|-id=617 bgcolor=#d6d6d6
| 91617 ||  || — || October 15, 1999 || Anderson Mesa || LONEOS || — || align=right | 13 km || 
|-id=618 bgcolor=#d6d6d6
| 91618 ||  || — || October 1, 1999 || Catalina || CSS || — || align=right | 6.2 km || 
|-id=619 bgcolor=#E9E9E9
| 91619 ||  || — || October 1, 1999 || Catalina || CSS || — || align=right | 5.3 km || 
|-id=620 bgcolor=#d6d6d6
| 91620 ||  || — || October 3, 1999 || Catalina || CSS || — || align=right | 5.2 km || 
|-id=621 bgcolor=#d6d6d6
| 91621 ||  || — || October 3, 1999 || Catalina || CSS || — || align=right | 5.4 km || 
|-id=622 bgcolor=#E9E9E9
| 91622 ||  || — || October 5, 1999 || Catalina || CSS || AGN || align=right | 3.0 km || 
|-id=623 bgcolor=#d6d6d6
| 91623 ||  || — || October 2, 1999 || Kitt Peak || Spacewatch || THM || align=right | 3.2 km || 
|-id=624 bgcolor=#d6d6d6
| 91624 ||  || — || October 3, 1999 || Kitt Peak || Spacewatch || — || align=right | 8.1 km || 
|-id=625 bgcolor=#d6d6d6
| 91625 ||  || — || October 6, 1999 || Kitt Peak || Spacewatch || ANF || align=right | 3.5 km || 
|-id=626 bgcolor=#d6d6d6
| 91626 ||  || — || October 6, 1999 || Kitt Peak || Spacewatch || — || align=right | 5.1 km || 
|-id=627 bgcolor=#d6d6d6
| 91627 ||  || — || October 6, 1999 || Kitt Peak || Spacewatch || — || align=right | 7.9 km || 
|-id=628 bgcolor=#d6d6d6
| 91628 ||  || — || October 6, 1999 || Kitt Peak || Spacewatch || ALA || align=right | 8.4 km || 
|-id=629 bgcolor=#d6d6d6
| 91629 ||  || — || October 6, 1999 || Kitt Peak || Spacewatch || — || align=right | 3.0 km || 
|-id=630 bgcolor=#d6d6d6
| 91630 ||  || — || October 7, 1999 || Kitt Peak || Spacewatch || EOS || align=right | 2.9 km || 
|-id=631 bgcolor=#d6d6d6
| 91631 ||  || — || October 8, 1999 || Kitt Peak || Spacewatch || — || align=right | 5.2 km || 
|-id=632 bgcolor=#d6d6d6
| 91632 ||  || — || October 8, 1999 || Kitt Peak || Spacewatch || THM || align=right | 7.8 km || 
|-id=633 bgcolor=#d6d6d6
| 91633 ||  || — || October 9, 1999 || Kitt Peak || Spacewatch || — || align=right | 7.1 km || 
|-id=634 bgcolor=#d6d6d6
| 91634 ||  || — || October 10, 1999 || Kitt Peak || Spacewatch || — || align=right | 5.5 km || 
|-id=635 bgcolor=#E9E9E9
| 91635 ||  || — || October 11, 1999 || Kitt Peak || Spacewatch || MIT || align=right | 5.7 km || 
|-id=636 bgcolor=#d6d6d6
| 91636 ||  || — || October 11, 1999 || Kitt Peak || Spacewatch || EOS || align=right | 3.6 km || 
|-id=637 bgcolor=#d6d6d6
| 91637 ||  || — || October 12, 1999 || Kitt Peak || Spacewatch || — || align=right | 5.0 km || 
|-id=638 bgcolor=#d6d6d6
| 91638 ||  || — || October 12, 1999 || Kitt Peak || Spacewatch || — || align=right | 5.0 km || 
|-id=639 bgcolor=#E9E9E9
| 91639 ||  || — || October 14, 1999 || Kitt Peak || Spacewatch || — || align=right | 3.4 km || 
|-id=640 bgcolor=#d6d6d6
| 91640 ||  || — || October 15, 1999 || Kitt Peak || Spacewatch || — || align=right | 4.4 km || 
|-id=641 bgcolor=#d6d6d6
| 91641 ||  || — || October 2, 1999 || Socorro || LINEAR || FIR || align=right | 11 km || 
|-id=642 bgcolor=#d6d6d6
| 91642 ||  || — || October 2, 1999 || Socorro || LINEAR || — || align=right | 9.3 km || 
|-id=643 bgcolor=#d6d6d6
| 91643 ||  || — || October 2, 1999 || Socorro || LINEAR || EOS || align=right | 6.6 km || 
|-id=644 bgcolor=#d6d6d6
| 91644 ||  || — || October 2, 1999 || Socorro || LINEAR || KOR || align=right | 3.4 km || 
|-id=645 bgcolor=#d6d6d6
| 91645 ||  || — || October 2, 1999 || Socorro || LINEAR || — || align=right | 5.9 km || 
|-id=646 bgcolor=#d6d6d6
| 91646 ||  || — || October 2, 1999 || Socorro || LINEAR || — || align=right | 2.2 km || 
|-id=647 bgcolor=#d6d6d6
| 91647 ||  || — || October 2, 1999 || Socorro || LINEAR || — || align=right | 10 km || 
|-id=648 bgcolor=#d6d6d6
| 91648 ||  || — || October 2, 1999 || Socorro || LINEAR || — || align=right | 5.6 km || 
|-id=649 bgcolor=#d6d6d6
| 91649 ||  || — || October 2, 1999 || Socorro || LINEAR || — || align=right | 5.5 km || 
|-id=650 bgcolor=#d6d6d6
| 91650 ||  || — || October 2, 1999 || Socorro || LINEAR || — || align=right | 7.3 km || 
|-id=651 bgcolor=#d6d6d6
| 91651 ||  || — || October 2, 1999 || Socorro || LINEAR || ALA || align=right | 8.1 km || 
|-id=652 bgcolor=#d6d6d6
| 91652 ||  || — || October 2, 1999 || Socorro || LINEAR || URS || align=right | 18 km || 
|-id=653 bgcolor=#d6d6d6
| 91653 ||  || — || October 2, 1999 || Socorro || LINEAR || — || align=right | 7.4 km || 
|-id=654 bgcolor=#d6d6d6
| 91654 ||  || — || October 2, 1999 || Socorro || LINEAR || EOS || align=right | 5.4 km || 
|-id=655 bgcolor=#E9E9E9
| 91655 ||  || — || October 3, 1999 || Socorro || LINEAR || — || align=right | 4.0 km || 
|-id=656 bgcolor=#d6d6d6
| 91656 ||  || — || October 3, 1999 || Socorro || LINEAR || EOS || align=right | 5.8 km || 
|-id=657 bgcolor=#d6d6d6
| 91657 ||  || — || October 3, 1999 || Socorro || LINEAR || — || align=right | 5.6 km || 
|-id=658 bgcolor=#d6d6d6
| 91658 ||  || — || October 3, 1999 || Socorro || LINEAR || — || align=right | 7.7 km || 
|-id=659 bgcolor=#d6d6d6
| 91659 ||  || — || October 3, 1999 || Socorro || LINEAR || — || align=right | 5.3 km || 
|-id=660 bgcolor=#d6d6d6
| 91660 ||  || — || October 3, 1999 || Socorro || LINEAR || — || align=right | 5.6 km || 
|-id=661 bgcolor=#E9E9E9
| 91661 ||  || — || October 4, 1999 || Socorro || LINEAR || — || align=right | 4.5 km || 
|-id=662 bgcolor=#E9E9E9
| 91662 ||  || — || October 4, 1999 || Socorro || LINEAR || — || align=right | 4.9 km || 
|-id=663 bgcolor=#d6d6d6
| 91663 ||  || — || October 4, 1999 || Socorro || LINEAR || — || align=right | 7.8 km || 
|-id=664 bgcolor=#E9E9E9
| 91664 ||  || — || October 4, 1999 || Socorro || LINEAR || DOR || align=right | 6.5 km || 
|-id=665 bgcolor=#d6d6d6
| 91665 ||  || — || October 4, 1999 || Socorro || LINEAR || — || align=right | 7.2 km || 
|-id=666 bgcolor=#E9E9E9
| 91666 ||  || — || October 4, 1999 || Socorro || LINEAR || — || align=right | 3.4 km || 
|-id=667 bgcolor=#d6d6d6
| 91667 ||  || — || October 4, 1999 || Socorro || LINEAR || — || align=right | 7.4 km || 
|-id=668 bgcolor=#d6d6d6
| 91668 ||  || — || October 4, 1999 || Socorro || LINEAR || EOS || align=right | 5.1 km || 
|-id=669 bgcolor=#d6d6d6
| 91669 ||  || — || October 4, 1999 || Socorro || LINEAR || — || align=right | 8.8 km || 
|-id=670 bgcolor=#E9E9E9
| 91670 ||  || — || October 4, 1999 || Socorro || LINEAR || HNA || align=right | 5.8 km || 
|-id=671 bgcolor=#d6d6d6
| 91671 ||  || — || October 4, 1999 || Socorro || LINEAR || KOR || align=right | 3.1 km || 
|-id=672 bgcolor=#E9E9E9
| 91672 ||  || — || October 4, 1999 || Socorro || LINEAR || — || align=right | 4.3 km || 
|-id=673 bgcolor=#d6d6d6
| 91673 ||  || — || October 4, 1999 || Socorro || LINEAR || CRO || align=right | 5.4 km || 
|-id=674 bgcolor=#d6d6d6
| 91674 ||  || — || October 4, 1999 || Socorro || LINEAR || NAE || align=right | 6.4 km || 
|-id=675 bgcolor=#d6d6d6
| 91675 ||  || — || October 4, 1999 || Socorro || LINEAR || EOS || align=right | 5.6 km || 
|-id=676 bgcolor=#d6d6d6
| 91676 ||  || — || October 4, 1999 || Socorro || LINEAR || — || align=right | 5.9 km || 
|-id=677 bgcolor=#d6d6d6
| 91677 ||  || — || October 4, 1999 || Socorro || LINEAR || EOS || align=right | 4.5 km || 
|-id=678 bgcolor=#d6d6d6
| 91678 ||  || — || October 4, 1999 || Socorro || LINEAR || — || align=right | 8.3 km || 
|-id=679 bgcolor=#d6d6d6
| 91679 ||  || — || October 4, 1999 || Socorro || LINEAR || — || align=right | 6.4 km || 
|-id=680 bgcolor=#d6d6d6
| 91680 ||  || — || October 4, 1999 || Socorro || LINEAR || — || align=right | 5.5 km || 
|-id=681 bgcolor=#d6d6d6
| 91681 ||  || — || October 4, 1999 || Socorro || LINEAR || — || align=right | 8.0 km || 
|-id=682 bgcolor=#d6d6d6
| 91682 ||  || — || October 4, 1999 || Socorro || LINEAR || — || align=right | 6.4 km || 
|-id=683 bgcolor=#d6d6d6
| 91683 ||  || — || October 4, 1999 || Socorro || LINEAR || TEL || align=right | 3.2 km || 
|-id=684 bgcolor=#d6d6d6
| 91684 ||  || — || October 4, 1999 || Socorro || LINEAR || 628 || align=right | 3.9 km || 
|-id=685 bgcolor=#d6d6d6
| 91685 ||  || — || October 4, 1999 || Socorro || LINEAR || — || align=right | 5.7 km || 
|-id=686 bgcolor=#d6d6d6
| 91686 ||  || — || October 4, 1999 || Socorro || LINEAR || — || align=right | 5.9 km || 
|-id=687 bgcolor=#d6d6d6
| 91687 ||  || — || October 4, 1999 || Socorro || LINEAR || — || align=right | 5.4 km || 
|-id=688 bgcolor=#d6d6d6
| 91688 ||  || — || October 4, 1999 || Socorro || LINEAR || K-2 || align=right | 3.0 km || 
|-id=689 bgcolor=#d6d6d6
| 91689 ||  || — || October 4, 1999 || Socorro || LINEAR || HYG || align=right | 5.2 km || 
|-id=690 bgcolor=#d6d6d6
| 91690 ||  || — || October 15, 1999 || Socorro || LINEAR || THM || align=right | 4.7 km || 
|-id=691 bgcolor=#d6d6d6
| 91691 ||  || — || October 6, 1999 || Socorro || LINEAR || 628 || align=right | 4.2 km || 
|-id=692 bgcolor=#d6d6d6
| 91692 ||  || — || October 6, 1999 || Socorro || LINEAR || — || align=right | 8.2 km || 
|-id=693 bgcolor=#d6d6d6
| 91693 ||  || — || October 6, 1999 || Socorro || LINEAR || — || align=right | 7.2 km || 
|-id=694 bgcolor=#d6d6d6
| 91694 ||  || — || October 6, 1999 || Socorro || LINEAR || KAR || align=right | 2.5 km || 
|-id=695 bgcolor=#d6d6d6
| 91695 ||  || — || October 6, 1999 || Socorro || LINEAR || HYG || align=right | 6.3 km || 
|-id=696 bgcolor=#d6d6d6
| 91696 ||  || — || October 6, 1999 || Socorro || LINEAR || — || align=right | 5.2 km || 
|-id=697 bgcolor=#d6d6d6
| 91697 ||  || — || October 6, 1999 || Socorro || LINEAR || — || align=right | 6.6 km || 
|-id=698 bgcolor=#d6d6d6
| 91698 ||  || — || October 6, 1999 || Socorro || LINEAR || KOR || align=right | 3.8 km || 
|-id=699 bgcolor=#d6d6d6
| 91699 ||  || — || October 6, 1999 || Socorro || LINEAR || — || align=right | 5.4 km || 
|-id=700 bgcolor=#d6d6d6
| 91700 ||  || — || October 6, 1999 || Socorro || LINEAR || — || align=right | 4.5 km || 
|}

91701–91800 

|-bgcolor=#E9E9E9
| 91701 ||  || — || October 7, 1999 || Socorro || LINEAR || — || align=right | 3.6 km || 
|-id=702 bgcolor=#d6d6d6
| 91702 ||  || — || October 7, 1999 || Socorro || LINEAR || — || align=right | 5.0 km || 
|-id=703 bgcolor=#d6d6d6
| 91703 ||  || — || October 7, 1999 || Socorro || LINEAR || TIR || align=right | 3.1 km || 
|-id=704 bgcolor=#d6d6d6
| 91704 ||  || — || October 7, 1999 || Socorro || LINEAR || KOR || align=right | 5.0 km || 
|-id=705 bgcolor=#d6d6d6
| 91705 ||  || — || October 7, 1999 || Socorro || LINEAR || HYG || align=right | 6.1 km || 
|-id=706 bgcolor=#d6d6d6
| 91706 ||  || — || October 7, 1999 || Socorro || LINEAR || KAR || align=right | 3.1 km || 
|-id=707 bgcolor=#d6d6d6
| 91707 ||  || — || October 7, 1999 || Socorro || LINEAR || — || align=right | 5.4 km || 
|-id=708 bgcolor=#d6d6d6
| 91708 ||  || — || October 7, 1999 || Socorro || LINEAR || KOR || align=right | 4.3 km || 
|-id=709 bgcolor=#d6d6d6
| 91709 ||  || — || October 7, 1999 || Socorro || LINEAR || — || align=right | 5.4 km || 
|-id=710 bgcolor=#d6d6d6
| 91710 ||  || — || October 7, 1999 || Socorro || LINEAR || — || align=right | 7.6 km || 
|-id=711 bgcolor=#d6d6d6
| 91711 ||  || — || October 7, 1999 || Socorro || LINEAR || — || align=right | 9.0 km || 
|-id=712 bgcolor=#d6d6d6
| 91712 ||  || — || October 7, 1999 || Socorro || LINEAR || — || align=right | 7.5 km || 
|-id=713 bgcolor=#d6d6d6
| 91713 ||  || — || October 7, 1999 || Socorro || LINEAR || — || align=right | 3.7 km || 
|-id=714 bgcolor=#E9E9E9
| 91714 ||  || — || October 7, 1999 || Socorro || LINEAR || — || align=right | 7.7 km || 
|-id=715 bgcolor=#d6d6d6
| 91715 ||  || — || October 7, 1999 || Socorro || LINEAR || — || align=right | 5.6 km || 
|-id=716 bgcolor=#d6d6d6
| 91716 ||  || — || October 7, 1999 || Socorro || LINEAR || — || align=right | 4.6 km || 
|-id=717 bgcolor=#d6d6d6
| 91717 ||  || — || October 7, 1999 || Socorro || LINEAR || — || align=right | 7.9 km || 
|-id=718 bgcolor=#d6d6d6
| 91718 ||  || — || October 7, 1999 || Socorro || LINEAR || — || align=right | 6.6 km || 
|-id=719 bgcolor=#d6d6d6
| 91719 ||  || — || October 7, 1999 || Socorro || LINEAR || — || align=right | 7.8 km || 
|-id=720 bgcolor=#d6d6d6
| 91720 ||  || — || October 7, 1999 || Socorro || LINEAR || HYG || align=right | 8.8 km || 
|-id=721 bgcolor=#d6d6d6
| 91721 ||  || — || October 9, 1999 || Socorro || LINEAR || EUP || align=right | 9.0 km || 
|-id=722 bgcolor=#d6d6d6
| 91722 ||  || — || October 9, 1999 || Socorro || LINEAR || EOS || align=right | 5.5 km || 
|-id=723 bgcolor=#d6d6d6
| 91723 ||  || — || October 7, 1999 || Socorro || LINEAR || — || align=right | 5.9 km || 
|-id=724 bgcolor=#d6d6d6
| 91724 ||  || — || October 7, 1999 || Socorro || LINEAR || EUP || align=right | 9.5 km || 
|-id=725 bgcolor=#E9E9E9
| 91725 ||  || — || October 8, 1999 || Socorro || LINEAR || MAR || align=right | 2.6 km || 
|-id=726 bgcolor=#d6d6d6
| 91726 ||  || — || October 9, 1999 || Socorro || LINEAR || — || align=right | 6.4 km || 
|-id=727 bgcolor=#d6d6d6
| 91727 ||  || — || October 9, 1999 || Socorro || LINEAR || — || align=right | 5.2 km || 
|-id=728 bgcolor=#d6d6d6
| 91728 ||  || — || October 9, 1999 || Socorro || LINEAR || EOS || align=right | 7.9 km || 
|-id=729 bgcolor=#d6d6d6
| 91729 ||  || — || October 9, 1999 || Socorro || LINEAR || EOS || align=right | 3.8 km || 
|-id=730 bgcolor=#d6d6d6
| 91730 ||  || — || October 9, 1999 || Socorro || LINEAR || — || align=right | 6.9 km || 
|-id=731 bgcolor=#d6d6d6
| 91731 ||  || — || October 10, 1999 || Socorro || LINEAR || — || align=right | 6.8 km || 
|-id=732 bgcolor=#E9E9E9
| 91732 ||  || — || October 10, 1999 || Socorro || LINEAR || — || align=right | 3.3 km || 
|-id=733 bgcolor=#d6d6d6
| 91733 ||  || — || October 10, 1999 || Socorro || LINEAR || — || align=right | 6.6 km || 
|-id=734 bgcolor=#d6d6d6
| 91734 ||  || — || October 10, 1999 || Socorro || LINEAR || EOS || align=right | 5.8 km || 
|-id=735 bgcolor=#d6d6d6
| 91735 ||  || — || October 10, 1999 || Socorro || LINEAR || — || align=right | 3.6 km || 
|-id=736 bgcolor=#d6d6d6
| 91736 ||  || — || October 10, 1999 || Socorro || LINEAR || — || align=right | 6.7 km || 
|-id=737 bgcolor=#d6d6d6
| 91737 ||  || — || October 10, 1999 || Socorro || LINEAR || — || align=right | 6.2 km || 
|-id=738 bgcolor=#d6d6d6
| 91738 ||  || — || October 10, 1999 || Socorro || LINEAR || 7:4 || align=right | 12 km || 
|-id=739 bgcolor=#d6d6d6
| 91739 ||  || — || October 10, 1999 || Socorro || LINEAR || — || align=right | 9.5 km || 
|-id=740 bgcolor=#d6d6d6
| 91740 ||  || — || October 10, 1999 || Socorro || LINEAR || — || align=right | 5.3 km || 
|-id=741 bgcolor=#d6d6d6
| 91741 ||  || — || October 10, 1999 || Socorro || LINEAR || — || align=right | 4.5 km || 
|-id=742 bgcolor=#d6d6d6
| 91742 ||  || — || October 10, 1999 || Socorro || LINEAR || — || align=right | 6.2 km || 
|-id=743 bgcolor=#d6d6d6
| 91743 ||  || — || October 10, 1999 || Socorro || LINEAR || — || align=right | 4.5 km || 
|-id=744 bgcolor=#d6d6d6
| 91744 ||  || — || October 11, 1999 || Socorro || LINEAR || EOS || align=right | 4.4 km || 
|-id=745 bgcolor=#d6d6d6
| 91745 ||  || — || October 12, 1999 || Socorro || LINEAR || — || align=right | 10 km || 
|-id=746 bgcolor=#d6d6d6
| 91746 ||  || — || October 12, 1999 || Socorro || LINEAR || — || align=right | 7.9 km || 
|-id=747 bgcolor=#d6d6d6
| 91747 ||  || — || October 12, 1999 || Socorro || LINEAR || URS || align=right | 8.4 km || 
|-id=748 bgcolor=#d6d6d6
| 91748 ||  || — || October 12, 1999 || Socorro || LINEAR || — || align=right | 9.3 km || 
|-id=749 bgcolor=#d6d6d6
| 91749 ||  || — || October 12, 1999 || Socorro || LINEAR || — || align=right | 5.2 km || 
|-id=750 bgcolor=#E9E9E9
| 91750 ||  || — || October 12, 1999 || Socorro || LINEAR || — || align=right | 3.3 km || 
|-id=751 bgcolor=#d6d6d6
| 91751 ||  || — || October 12, 1999 || Socorro || LINEAR || — || align=right | 4.7 km || 
|-id=752 bgcolor=#d6d6d6
| 91752 ||  || — || October 12, 1999 || Socorro || LINEAR || — || align=right | 6.7 km || 
|-id=753 bgcolor=#d6d6d6
| 91753 ||  || — || October 12, 1999 || Socorro || LINEAR || EOS || align=right | 8.2 km || 
|-id=754 bgcolor=#d6d6d6
| 91754 ||  || — || October 12, 1999 || Socorro || LINEAR || — || align=right | 5.0 km || 
|-id=755 bgcolor=#d6d6d6
| 91755 ||  || — || October 12, 1999 || Socorro || LINEAR || EOS || align=right | 3.3 km || 
|-id=756 bgcolor=#d6d6d6
| 91756 ||  || — || October 12, 1999 || Socorro || LINEAR || — || align=right | 7.5 km || 
|-id=757 bgcolor=#d6d6d6
| 91757 ||  || — || October 12, 1999 || Socorro || LINEAR || — || align=right | 3.0 km || 
|-id=758 bgcolor=#d6d6d6
| 91758 ||  || — || October 12, 1999 || Socorro || LINEAR || — || align=right | 6.4 km || 
|-id=759 bgcolor=#d6d6d6
| 91759 ||  || — || October 12, 1999 || Socorro || LINEAR || EOS || align=right | 4.5 km || 
|-id=760 bgcolor=#d6d6d6
| 91760 ||  || — || October 12, 1999 || Socorro || LINEAR || — || align=right | 6.3 km || 
|-id=761 bgcolor=#d6d6d6
| 91761 ||  || — || October 12, 1999 || Socorro || LINEAR || — || align=right | 6.5 km || 
|-id=762 bgcolor=#d6d6d6
| 91762 ||  || — || October 12, 1999 || Socorro || LINEAR || — || align=right | 6.4 km || 
|-id=763 bgcolor=#d6d6d6
| 91763 ||  || — || October 12, 1999 || Socorro || LINEAR || — || align=right | 6.9 km || 
|-id=764 bgcolor=#d6d6d6
| 91764 ||  || — || October 12, 1999 || Socorro || LINEAR || — || align=right | 5.9 km || 
|-id=765 bgcolor=#d6d6d6
| 91765 ||  || — || October 12, 1999 || Socorro || LINEAR || CRO || align=right | 7.5 km || 
|-id=766 bgcolor=#d6d6d6
| 91766 ||  || — || October 12, 1999 || Socorro || LINEAR || EOS || align=right | 4.2 km || 
|-id=767 bgcolor=#d6d6d6
| 91767 ||  || — || October 12, 1999 || Socorro || LINEAR || — || align=right | 6.1 km || 
|-id=768 bgcolor=#d6d6d6
| 91768 ||  || — || October 12, 1999 || Socorro || LINEAR || EOS || align=right | 4.2 km || 
|-id=769 bgcolor=#d6d6d6
| 91769 ||  || — || October 12, 1999 || Socorro || LINEAR || — || align=right | 6.2 km || 
|-id=770 bgcolor=#d6d6d6
| 91770 ||  || — || October 12, 1999 || Socorro || LINEAR || — || align=right | 5.6 km || 
|-id=771 bgcolor=#d6d6d6
| 91771 ||  || — || October 13, 1999 || Socorro || LINEAR || EOS || align=right | 3.3 km || 
|-id=772 bgcolor=#d6d6d6
| 91772 ||  || — || October 13, 1999 || Socorro || LINEAR || — || align=right | 4.5 km || 
|-id=773 bgcolor=#d6d6d6
| 91773 ||  || — || October 13, 1999 || Socorro || LINEAR || — || align=right | 4.4 km || 
|-id=774 bgcolor=#d6d6d6
| 91774 ||  || — || October 13, 1999 || Socorro || LINEAR || — || align=right | 6.5 km || 
|-id=775 bgcolor=#d6d6d6
| 91775 ||  || — || October 13, 1999 || Socorro || LINEAR || — || align=right | 7.0 km || 
|-id=776 bgcolor=#d6d6d6
| 91776 ||  || — || October 13, 1999 || Socorro || LINEAR || Tj (2.98) || align=right | 17 km || 
|-id=777 bgcolor=#d6d6d6
| 91777 ||  || — || October 13, 1999 || Socorro || LINEAR || EOS || align=right | 8.1 km || 
|-id=778 bgcolor=#d6d6d6
| 91778 ||  || — || October 14, 1999 || Socorro || LINEAR || LUT || align=right | 9.4 km || 
|-id=779 bgcolor=#d6d6d6
| 91779 ||  || — || October 14, 1999 || Socorro || LINEAR || URS || align=right | 9.0 km || 
|-id=780 bgcolor=#d6d6d6
| 91780 ||  || — || October 15, 1999 || Socorro || LINEAR || — || align=right | 5.9 km || 
|-id=781 bgcolor=#E9E9E9
| 91781 ||  || — || October 15, 1999 || Socorro || LINEAR || — || align=right | 3.6 km || 
|-id=782 bgcolor=#d6d6d6
| 91782 ||  || — || October 15, 1999 || Socorro || LINEAR || — || align=right | 5.1 km || 
|-id=783 bgcolor=#d6d6d6
| 91783 ||  || — || October 15, 1999 || Socorro || LINEAR || KOR || align=right | 3.1 km || 
|-id=784 bgcolor=#d6d6d6
| 91784 ||  || — || October 15, 1999 || Socorro || LINEAR || — || align=right | 5.3 km || 
|-id=785 bgcolor=#d6d6d6
| 91785 ||  || — || October 15, 1999 || Socorro || LINEAR || EOS || align=right | 3.9 km || 
|-id=786 bgcolor=#d6d6d6
| 91786 ||  || — || October 12, 1999 || Socorro || LINEAR || EOS || align=right | 3.8 km || 
|-id=787 bgcolor=#d6d6d6
| 91787 ||  || — || October 1, 1999 || Catalina || CSS || — || align=right | 10 km || 
|-id=788 bgcolor=#d6d6d6
| 91788 ||  || — || October 2, 1999 || Catalina || CSS || — || align=right | 6.2 km || 
|-id=789 bgcolor=#E9E9E9
| 91789 ||  || — || October 2, 1999 || Socorro || LINEAR || GEF || align=right | 3.1 km || 
|-id=790 bgcolor=#d6d6d6
| 91790 ||  || — || October 2, 1999 || Anderson Mesa || LONEOS || — || align=right | 6.0 km || 
|-id=791 bgcolor=#d6d6d6
| 91791 ||  || — || October 3, 1999 || Catalina || CSS || EOS || align=right | 4.5 km || 
|-id=792 bgcolor=#d6d6d6
| 91792 ||  || — || October 2, 1999 || Socorro || LINEAR || — || align=right | 5.7 km || 
|-id=793 bgcolor=#d6d6d6
| 91793 ||  || — || October 1, 1999 || Catalina || CSS || TEL || align=right | 2.9 km || 
|-id=794 bgcolor=#d6d6d6
| 91794 ||  || — || October 12, 1999 || Socorro || LINEAR || — || align=right | 5.2 km || 
|-id=795 bgcolor=#d6d6d6
| 91795 ||  || — || October 2, 1999 || Socorro || LINEAR || — || align=right | 3.6 km || 
|-id=796 bgcolor=#d6d6d6
| 91796 ||  || — || October 3, 1999 || Anderson Mesa || LONEOS || NAE || align=right | 6.7 km || 
|-id=797 bgcolor=#d6d6d6
| 91797 ||  || — || October 3, 1999 || Socorro || LINEAR || BRA || align=right | 5.2 km || 
|-id=798 bgcolor=#E9E9E9
| 91798 ||  || — || October 3, 1999 || Socorro || LINEAR || GEF || align=right | 2.6 km || 
|-id=799 bgcolor=#d6d6d6
| 91799 ||  || — || October 3, 1999 || Socorro || LINEAR || — || align=right | 6.4 km || 
|-id=800 bgcolor=#d6d6d6
| 91800 ||  || — || October 3, 1999 || Socorro || LINEAR || — || align=right | 8.3 km || 
|}

91801–91900 

|-bgcolor=#d6d6d6
| 91801 ||  || — || October 3, 1999 || Catalina || CSS || — || align=right | 6.4 km || 
|-id=802 bgcolor=#d6d6d6
| 91802 ||  || — || October 3, 1999 || Catalina || CSS || — || align=right | 5.7 km || 
|-id=803 bgcolor=#d6d6d6
| 91803 ||  || — || October 3, 1999 || Catalina || CSS || — || align=right | 6.2 km || 
|-id=804 bgcolor=#d6d6d6
| 91804 ||  || — || October 4, 1999 || Kitt Peak || Spacewatch || KOR || align=right | 2.4 km || 
|-id=805 bgcolor=#d6d6d6
| 91805 ||  || — || October 4, 1999 || Catalina || CSS || — || align=right | 5.6 km || 
|-id=806 bgcolor=#d6d6d6
| 91806 ||  || — || October 7, 1999 || Catalina || CSS || — || align=right | 6.5 km || 
|-id=807 bgcolor=#d6d6d6
| 91807 ||  || — || October 7, 1999 || Catalina || CSS || — || align=right | 7.4 km || 
|-id=808 bgcolor=#d6d6d6
| 91808 ||  || — || October 8, 1999 || Catalina || CSS || — || align=right | 5.7 km || 
|-id=809 bgcolor=#d6d6d6
| 91809 ||  || — || October 8, 1999 || Catalina || CSS || EOS || align=right | 4.6 km || 
|-id=810 bgcolor=#d6d6d6
| 91810 ||  || — || October 9, 1999 || Catalina || CSS || — || align=right | 6.5 km || 
|-id=811 bgcolor=#d6d6d6
| 91811 ||  || — || October 8, 1999 || Socorro || LINEAR || — || align=right | 4.1 km || 
|-id=812 bgcolor=#E9E9E9
| 91812 ||  || — || October 9, 1999 || Socorro || LINEAR || — || align=right | 2.3 km || 
|-id=813 bgcolor=#d6d6d6
| 91813 ||  || — || October 8, 1999 || Socorro || LINEAR || — || align=right | 8.7 km || 
|-id=814 bgcolor=#d6d6d6
| 91814 ||  || — || October 13, 1999 || Socorro || LINEAR || — || align=right | 7.7 km || 
|-id=815 bgcolor=#d6d6d6
| 91815 ||  || — || October 3, 1999 || Socorro || LINEAR || FIR || align=right | 7.4 km || 
|-id=816 bgcolor=#d6d6d6
| 91816 ||  || — || October 3, 1999 || Socorro || LINEAR || EOS || align=right | 4.7 km || 
|-id=817 bgcolor=#E9E9E9
| 91817 ||  || — || October 3, 1999 || Socorro || LINEAR || — || align=right | 2.8 km || 
|-id=818 bgcolor=#E9E9E9
| 91818 ||  || — || October 3, 1999 || Socorro || LINEAR || — || align=right | 4.2 km || 
|-id=819 bgcolor=#d6d6d6
| 91819 ||  || — || October 3, 1999 || Socorro || LINEAR || — || align=right | 6.4 km || 
|-id=820 bgcolor=#d6d6d6
| 91820 ||  || — || October 3, 1999 || Socorro || LINEAR || — || align=right | 5.7 km || 
|-id=821 bgcolor=#d6d6d6
| 91821 ||  || — || October 6, 1999 || Socorro || LINEAR || EOS || align=right | 4.3 km || 
|-id=822 bgcolor=#d6d6d6
| 91822 ||  || — || October 6, 1999 || Socorro || LINEAR || — || align=right | 5.8 km || 
|-id=823 bgcolor=#d6d6d6
| 91823 ||  || — || October 7, 1999 || Socorro || LINEAR || THM || align=right | 5.1 km || 
|-id=824 bgcolor=#d6d6d6
| 91824 ||  || — || October 8, 1999 || Socorro || LINEAR || — || align=right | 6.2 km || 
|-id=825 bgcolor=#d6d6d6
| 91825 ||  || — || October 8, 1999 || Socorro || LINEAR || — || align=right | 3.9 km || 
|-id=826 bgcolor=#d6d6d6
| 91826 ||  || — || October 8, 1999 || Socorro || LINEAR || — || align=right | 8.9 km || 
|-id=827 bgcolor=#d6d6d6
| 91827 ||  || — || October 9, 1999 || Socorro || LINEAR || — || align=right | 5.5 km || 
|-id=828 bgcolor=#d6d6d6
| 91828 ||  || — || October 9, 1999 || Socorro || LINEAR || KOR || align=right | 3.0 km || 
|-id=829 bgcolor=#d6d6d6
| 91829 ||  || — || October 9, 1999 || Socorro || LINEAR || HYG || align=right | 6.3 km || 
|-id=830 bgcolor=#d6d6d6
| 91830 ||  || — || October 2, 1999 || Catalina || CSS || — || align=right | 5.9 km || 
|-id=831 bgcolor=#d6d6d6
| 91831 ||  || — || October 2, 1999 || Kitt Peak || Spacewatch || KOR || align=right | 2.0 km || 
|-id=832 bgcolor=#d6d6d6
| 91832 ||  || — || October 3, 1999 || Catalina || CSS || EOS || align=right | 3.9 km || 
|-id=833 bgcolor=#d6d6d6
| 91833 ||  || — || October 6, 1999 || Socorro || LINEAR || — || align=right | 2.4 km || 
|-id=834 bgcolor=#d6d6d6
| 91834 ||  || — || October 6, 1999 || Kitt Peak || Spacewatch || KOR || align=right | 2.5 km || 
|-id=835 bgcolor=#d6d6d6
| 91835 ||  || — || October 4, 1999 || Kitt Peak || Spacewatch || — || align=right | 4.6 km || 
|-id=836 bgcolor=#d6d6d6
| 91836 ||  || — || October 5, 1999 || Catalina || CSS || — || align=right | 6.5 km || 
|-id=837 bgcolor=#d6d6d6
| 91837 ||  || — || October 5, 1999 || Catalina || CSS || KOR || align=right | 3.9 km || 
|-id=838 bgcolor=#d6d6d6
| 91838 ||  || — || October 8, 1999 || Socorro || LINEAR || LIX || align=right | 6.9 km || 
|-id=839 bgcolor=#d6d6d6
| 91839 ||  || — || October 8, 1999 || Catalina || CSS || — || align=right | 7.4 km || 
|-id=840 bgcolor=#d6d6d6
| 91840 ||  || — || October 12, 1999 || Kitt Peak || Spacewatch || — || align=right | 3.6 km || 
|-id=841 bgcolor=#d6d6d6
| 91841 ||  || — || October 10, 1999 || Socorro || LINEAR || — || align=right | 5.3 km || 
|-id=842 bgcolor=#d6d6d6
| 91842 ||  || — || October 2, 1999 || Socorro || LINEAR || ALA || align=right | 6.0 km || 
|-id=843 bgcolor=#d6d6d6
| 91843 ||  || — || October 16, 1999 || Višnjan Observatory || K. Korlević || TIR || align=right | 4.1 km || 
|-id=844 bgcolor=#d6d6d6
| 91844 ||  || — || October 19, 1999 || Ondřejov || P. Kušnirák, P. Pravec || — || align=right | 7.1 km || 
|-id=845 bgcolor=#d6d6d6
| 91845 ||  || — || October 19, 1999 || Ondřejov || P. Kušnirák, P. Pravec || — || align=right | 6.7 km || 
|-id=846 bgcolor=#d6d6d6
| 91846 ||  || — || October 31, 1999 || Prescott || P. G. Comba || FIR || align=right | 4.1 km || 
|-id=847 bgcolor=#d6d6d6
| 91847 ||  || — || October 29, 1999 || Catalina || CSS || — || align=right | 7.8 km || 
|-id=848 bgcolor=#d6d6d6
| 91848 ||  || — || October 28, 1999 || Xinglong || SCAP || KOR || align=right | 3.4 km || 
|-id=849 bgcolor=#d6d6d6
| 91849 ||  || — || October 28, 1999 || Xinglong || SCAP || — || align=right | 14 km || 
|-id=850 bgcolor=#d6d6d6
| 91850 ||  || — || October 31, 1999 || Ondřejov || L. Kotková || VER || align=right | 5.7 km || 
|-id=851 bgcolor=#d6d6d6
| 91851 ||  || — || October 29, 1999 || Catalina || CSS || slow || align=right | 6.1 km || 
|-id=852 bgcolor=#d6d6d6
| 91852 ||  || — || October 29, 1999 || Catalina || CSS || KOR || align=right | 3.5 km || 
|-id=853 bgcolor=#d6d6d6
| 91853 ||  || — || October 29, 1999 || Catalina || CSS || — || align=right | 7.5 km || 
|-id=854 bgcolor=#d6d6d6
| 91854 ||  || — || October 29, 1999 || Catalina || CSS || — || align=right | 5.7 km || 
|-id=855 bgcolor=#d6d6d6
| 91855 ||  || — || October 31, 1999 || Socorro || LINEAR || — || align=right | 7.2 km || 
|-id=856 bgcolor=#E9E9E9
| 91856 ||  || — || October 29, 1999 || Catalina || CSS || — || align=right | 7.0 km || 
|-id=857 bgcolor=#d6d6d6
| 91857 ||  || — || October 29, 1999 || Catalina || CSS || TIR || align=right | 5.4 km || 
|-id=858 bgcolor=#d6d6d6
| 91858 ||  || — || October 29, 1999 || Catalina || CSS || — || align=right | 5.8 km || 
|-id=859 bgcolor=#d6d6d6
| 91859 ||  || — || October 30, 1999 || Kitt Peak || Spacewatch || — || align=right | 4.8 km || 
|-id=860 bgcolor=#d6d6d6
| 91860 ||  || — || October 30, 1999 || Kitt Peak || Spacewatch || — || align=right | 4.5 km || 
|-id=861 bgcolor=#d6d6d6
| 91861 ||  || — || October 30, 1999 || Kitt Peak || Spacewatch || — || align=right | 7.7 km || 
|-id=862 bgcolor=#d6d6d6
| 91862 ||  || — || October 31, 1999 || Kitt Peak || Spacewatch || — || align=right | 4.0 km || 
|-id=863 bgcolor=#E9E9E9
| 91863 ||  || — || October 28, 1999 || Catalina || CSS || — || align=right | 3.7 km || 
|-id=864 bgcolor=#d6d6d6
| 91864 ||  || — || October 28, 1999 || Catalina || CSS || — || align=right | 12 km || 
|-id=865 bgcolor=#d6d6d6
| 91865 ||  || — || October 28, 1999 || Catalina || CSS || — || align=right | 7.6 km || 
|-id=866 bgcolor=#E9E9E9
| 91866 ||  || — || October 30, 1999 || Kitt Peak || Spacewatch || — || align=right | 5.7 km || 
|-id=867 bgcolor=#d6d6d6
| 91867 ||  || — || October 31, 1999 || Kitt Peak || Spacewatch || — || align=right | 3.7 km || 
|-id=868 bgcolor=#E9E9E9
| 91868 ||  || — || October 16, 1999 || Kitt Peak || Spacewatch || — || align=right | 5.6 km || 
|-id=869 bgcolor=#d6d6d6
| 91869 ||  || — || October 29, 1999 || Anderson Mesa || LONEOS || — || align=right | 10 km || 
|-id=870 bgcolor=#d6d6d6
| 91870 ||  || — || October 29, 1999 || Anderson Mesa || LONEOS || — || align=right | 5.1 km || 
|-id=871 bgcolor=#d6d6d6
| 91871 ||  || — || October 31, 1999 || Kitt Peak || Spacewatch || — || align=right | 6.5 km || 
|-id=872 bgcolor=#d6d6d6
| 91872 ||  || — || October 18, 1999 || Kitt Peak || Spacewatch || — || align=right | 6.0 km || 
|-id=873 bgcolor=#d6d6d6
| 91873 ||  || — || October 28, 1999 || Catalina || CSS || ALA || align=right | 9.6 km || 
|-id=874 bgcolor=#d6d6d6
| 91874 ||  || — || October 29, 1999 || Catalina || CSS || — || align=right | 6.7 km || 
|-id=875 bgcolor=#d6d6d6
| 91875 ||  || — || October 29, 1999 || Catalina || CSS || ALA || align=right | 10 km || 
|-id=876 bgcolor=#d6d6d6
| 91876 ||  || — || October 30, 1999 || Anderson Mesa || LONEOS || — || align=right | 7.8 km || 
|-id=877 bgcolor=#E9E9E9
| 91877 ||  || — || October 31, 1999 || Catalina || CSS || — || align=right | 5.3 km || 
|-id=878 bgcolor=#d6d6d6
| 91878 ||  || — || October 31, 1999 || Catalina || CSS || — || align=right | 8.5 km || 
|-id=879 bgcolor=#d6d6d6
| 91879 ||  || — || October 31, 1999 || Catalina || CSS || — || align=right | 4.4 km || 
|-id=880 bgcolor=#d6d6d6
| 91880 ||  || — || October 31, 1999 || Catalina || CSS || — || align=right | 8.0 km || 
|-id=881 bgcolor=#d6d6d6
| 91881 ||  || — || October 31, 1999 || Anderson Mesa || LONEOS || — || align=right | 6.7 km || 
|-id=882 bgcolor=#E9E9E9
| 91882 ||  || — || October 31, 1999 || Catalina || CSS || WAT || align=right | 4.3 km || 
|-id=883 bgcolor=#d6d6d6
| 91883 ||  || — || October 31, 1999 || Catalina || CSS || HYG || align=right | 5.3 km || 
|-id=884 bgcolor=#d6d6d6
| 91884 ||  || — || October 31, 1999 || Catalina || CSS || HYG || align=right | 5.1 km || 
|-id=885 bgcolor=#d6d6d6
| 91885 ||  || — || October 31, 1999 || Catalina || CSS || — || align=right | 5.0 km || 
|-id=886 bgcolor=#d6d6d6
| 91886 ||  || — || October 30, 1999 || Catalina || CSS || — || align=right | 5.6 km || 
|-id=887 bgcolor=#d6d6d6
| 91887 ||  || — || October 30, 1999 || Kitt Peak || Spacewatch || — || align=right | 4.5 km || 
|-id=888 bgcolor=#d6d6d6
| 91888 Tomskilling ||  ||  || October 31, 1999 || Catalina || CSS || — || align=right | 4.3 km || 
|-id=889 bgcolor=#d6d6d6
| 91889 ||  || — || October 31, 1999 || Catalina || CSS || — || align=right | 4.4 km || 
|-id=890 bgcolor=#d6d6d6
| 91890 Kiriko Matsuri ||  ||  || November 4, 1999 || Yanagida || A. Tsuchikawa || EOS || align=right | 5.6 km || 
|-id=891 bgcolor=#d6d6d6
| 91891 ||  || — || November 5, 1999 || Oizumi || T. Kobayashi || EOS || align=right | 5.1 km || 
|-id=892 bgcolor=#d6d6d6
| 91892 ||  || — || November 1, 1999 || Kitt Peak || Spacewatch || THM || align=right | 4.3 km || 
|-id=893 bgcolor=#d6d6d6
| 91893 ||  || — || November 1, 1999 || Catalina || CSS || EOS || align=right | 7.8 km || 
|-id=894 bgcolor=#d6d6d6
| 91894 ||  || — || November 6, 1999 || High Point || D. K. Chesney || — || align=right | 6.8 km || 
|-id=895 bgcolor=#d6d6d6
| 91895 ||  || — || November 5, 1999 || Oizumi || T. Kobayashi || EOS || align=right | 5.5 km || 
|-id=896 bgcolor=#d6d6d6
| 91896 ||  || — || November 9, 1999 || Fountain Hills || C. W. Juels || — || align=right | 4.8 km || 
|-id=897 bgcolor=#d6d6d6
| 91897 ||  || — || November 9, 1999 || Fountain Hills || C. W. Juels || — || align=right | 8.3 km || 
|-id=898 bgcolor=#d6d6d6
| 91898 Margnetti ||  ||  || November 8, 1999 || Gnosca || S. Sposetti || — || align=right | 7.6 km || 
|-id=899 bgcolor=#d6d6d6
| 91899 ||  || — || November 7, 1999 || Reedy Creek || J. Broughton || — || align=right | 7.9 km || 
|-id=900 bgcolor=#d6d6d6
| 91900 ||  || — || November 5, 1999 || San Marcello || L. Tesi, M. Tombelli || HYG || align=right | 6.2 km || 
|}

91901–92000 

|-bgcolor=#d6d6d6
| 91901 ||  || — || November 2, 1999 || Kitt Peak || Spacewatch || — || align=right | 3.6 km || 
|-id=902 bgcolor=#d6d6d6
| 91902 ||  || — || November 2, 1999 || Kitt Peak || Spacewatch || EOS || align=right | 4.4 km || 
|-id=903 bgcolor=#d6d6d6
| 91903 ||  || — || November 10, 1999 || Farpoint || G. Bell, G. Hug || EUP || align=right | 8.6 km || 
|-id=904 bgcolor=#d6d6d6
| 91904 ||  || — || November 7, 1999 || Reedy Creek || J. Broughton || THM || align=right | 5.2 km || 
|-id=905 bgcolor=#d6d6d6
| 91905 ||  || — || November 10, 1999 || Višnjan Observatory || K. Korlević || — || align=right | 5.6 km || 
|-id=906 bgcolor=#d6d6d6
| 91906 ||  || — || November 15, 1999 || Zeno || T. Stafford || — || align=right | 10 km || 
|-id=907 bgcolor=#d6d6d6
| 91907 Shiho ||  ||  || November 13, 1999 || Kuma Kogen || A. Nakamura || — || align=right | 6.6 km || 
|-id=908 bgcolor=#d6d6d6
| 91908 ||  || — || November 3, 1999 || Catalina || CSS || — || align=right | 13 km || 
|-id=909 bgcolor=#d6d6d6
| 91909 ||  || — || November 3, 1999 || Socorro || LINEAR || KOR || align=right | 3.6 km || 
|-id=910 bgcolor=#d6d6d6
| 91910 ||  || — || November 3, 1999 || Socorro || LINEAR || THM || align=right | 4.5 km || 
|-id=911 bgcolor=#d6d6d6
| 91911 ||  || — || November 3, 1999 || Socorro || LINEAR || — || align=right | 6.8 km || 
|-id=912 bgcolor=#d6d6d6
| 91912 ||  || — || November 3, 1999 || Socorro || LINEAR || — || align=right | 6.8 km || 
|-id=913 bgcolor=#d6d6d6
| 91913 ||  || — || November 3, 1999 || Socorro || LINEAR || HYG || align=right | 6.3 km || 
|-id=914 bgcolor=#d6d6d6
| 91914 ||  || — || November 3, 1999 || Socorro || LINEAR || — || align=right | 5.0 km || 
|-id=915 bgcolor=#d6d6d6
| 91915 ||  || — || November 3, 1999 || Socorro || LINEAR || — || align=right | 6.8 km || 
|-id=916 bgcolor=#d6d6d6
| 91916 ||  || — || November 3, 1999 || Socorro || LINEAR || — || align=right | 5.1 km || 
|-id=917 bgcolor=#d6d6d6
| 91917 ||  || — || November 3, 1999 || Socorro || LINEAR || — || align=right | 4.1 km || 
|-id=918 bgcolor=#d6d6d6
| 91918 ||  || — || November 3, 1999 || Socorro || LINEAR || THM || align=right | 6.1 km || 
|-id=919 bgcolor=#d6d6d6
| 91919 ||  || — || November 3, 1999 || Socorro || LINEAR || — || align=right | 3.8 km || 
|-id=920 bgcolor=#d6d6d6
| 91920 ||  || — || November 3, 1999 || Socorro || LINEAR || — || align=right | 6.2 km || 
|-id=921 bgcolor=#d6d6d6
| 91921 ||  || — || November 3, 1999 || Socorro || LINEAR || — || align=right | 5.3 km || 
|-id=922 bgcolor=#d6d6d6
| 91922 ||  || — || November 3, 1999 || Socorro || LINEAR || — || align=right | 9.1 km || 
|-id=923 bgcolor=#d6d6d6
| 91923 ||  || — || November 10, 1999 || Socorro || LINEAR || — || align=right | 4.9 km || 
|-id=924 bgcolor=#d6d6d6
| 91924 ||  || — || November 10, 1999 || Socorro || LINEAR || — || align=right | 6.5 km || 
|-id=925 bgcolor=#d6d6d6
| 91925 ||  || — || November 10, 1999 || Socorro || LINEAR || — || align=right | 5.8 km || 
|-id=926 bgcolor=#d6d6d6
| 91926 ||  || — || November 10, 1999 || Socorro || LINEAR || — || align=right | 5.6 km || 
|-id=927 bgcolor=#d6d6d6
| 91927 ||  || — || November 10, 1999 || Socorro || LINEAR || — || align=right | 6.5 km || 
|-id=928 bgcolor=#d6d6d6
| 91928 ||  || — || November 3, 1999 || Socorro || LINEAR || EOS || align=right | 5.0 km || 
|-id=929 bgcolor=#d6d6d6
| 91929 ||  || — || November 3, 1999 || Socorro || LINEAR || — || align=right | 7.6 km || 
|-id=930 bgcolor=#d6d6d6
| 91930 ||  || — || November 3, 1999 || Socorro || LINEAR || — || align=right | 4.2 km || 
|-id=931 bgcolor=#d6d6d6
| 91931 ||  || — || November 3, 1999 || Socorro || LINEAR || — || align=right | 7.5 km || 
|-id=932 bgcolor=#d6d6d6
| 91932 ||  || — || November 4, 1999 || Socorro || LINEAR || — || align=right | 5.6 km || 
|-id=933 bgcolor=#d6d6d6
| 91933 ||  || — || November 4, 1999 || Socorro || LINEAR || — || align=right | 10 km || 
|-id=934 bgcolor=#d6d6d6
| 91934 ||  || — || November 4, 1999 || Socorro || LINEAR || THM || align=right | 5.0 km || 
|-id=935 bgcolor=#d6d6d6
| 91935 ||  || — || November 4, 1999 || Socorro || LINEAR || THM || align=right | 8.5 km || 
|-id=936 bgcolor=#d6d6d6
| 91936 ||  || — || November 4, 1999 || Socorro || LINEAR || — || align=right | 5.9 km || 
|-id=937 bgcolor=#d6d6d6
| 91937 ||  || — || November 4, 1999 || Socorro || LINEAR || — || align=right | 12 km || 
|-id=938 bgcolor=#d6d6d6
| 91938 ||  || — || November 4, 1999 || Socorro || LINEAR || — || align=right | 6.1 km || 
|-id=939 bgcolor=#E9E9E9
| 91939 ||  || — || November 4, 1999 || Socorro || LINEAR || — || align=right | 9.7 km || 
|-id=940 bgcolor=#d6d6d6
| 91940 ||  || — || November 4, 1999 || Socorro || LINEAR || — || align=right | 7.5 km || 
|-id=941 bgcolor=#d6d6d6
| 91941 ||  || — || November 4, 1999 || Socorro || LINEAR || — || align=right | 8.1 km || 
|-id=942 bgcolor=#d6d6d6
| 91942 ||  || — || November 4, 1999 || Socorro || LINEAR || THM || align=right | 5.2 km || 
|-id=943 bgcolor=#d6d6d6
| 91943 ||  || — || November 4, 1999 || Socorro || LINEAR || — || align=right | 9.5 km || 
|-id=944 bgcolor=#d6d6d6
| 91944 ||  || — || November 4, 1999 || Socorro || LINEAR || — || align=right | 6.2 km || 
|-id=945 bgcolor=#d6d6d6
| 91945 ||  || — || November 4, 1999 || Socorro || LINEAR || THM || align=right | 7.3 km || 
|-id=946 bgcolor=#d6d6d6
| 91946 ||  || — || November 4, 1999 || Socorro || LINEAR || TIR || align=right | 7.7 km || 
|-id=947 bgcolor=#d6d6d6
| 91947 ||  || — || November 4, 1999 || Socorro || LINEAR || — || align=right | 6.1 km || 
|-id=948 bgcolor=#d6d6d6
| 91948 ||  || — || November 4, 1999 || Socorro || LINEAR || — || align=right | 6.4 km || 
|-id=949 bgcolor=#d6d6d6
| 91949 ||  || — || November 4, 1999 || Socorro || LINEAR || EOS || align=right | 4.3 km || 
|-id=950 bgcolor=#d6d6d6
| 91950 ||  || — || November 4, 1999 || Socorro || LINEAR || URS || align=right | 6.7 km || 
|-id=951 bgcolor=#d6d6d6
| 91951 ||  || — || November 4, 1999 || Socorro || LINEAR || — || align=right | 8.4 km || 
|-id=952 bgcolor=#d6d6d6
| 91952 ||  || — || November 4, 1999 || Socorro || LINEAR || THM || align=right | 4.9 km || 
|-id=953 bgcolor=#d6d6d6
| 91953 ||  || — || November 4, 1999 || Socorro || LINEAR || — || align=right | 5.1 km || 
|-id=954 bgcolor=#d6d6d6
| 91954 ||  || — || November 5, 1999 || Kitt Peak || Spacewatch || — || align=right | 5.6 km || 
|-id=955 bgcolor=#d6d6d6
| 91955 ||  || — || November 3, 1999 || Socorro || LINEAR || HYG || align=right | 6.8 km || 
|-id=956 bgcolor=#d6d6d6
| 91956 ||  || — || November 3, 1999 || Socorro || LINEAR || EOS || align=right | 4.7 km || 
|-id=957 bgcolor=#d6d6d6
| 91957 ||  || — || November 4, 1999 || Socorro || LINEAR || HYG || align=right | 6.9 km || 
|-id=958 bgcolor=#d6d6d6
| 91958 ||  || — || November 4, 1999 || Socorro || LINEAR || EOS || align=right | 4.0 km || 
|-id=959 bgcolor=#d6d6d6
| 91959 ||  || — || November 4, 1999 || Socorro || LINEAR || — || align=right | 5.6 km || 
|-id=960 bgcolor=#fefefe
| 91960 ||  || — || November 4, 1999 || Socorro || LINEAR || H || align=right | 1.1 km || 
|-id=961 bgcolor=#d6d6d6
| 91961 ||  || — || November 4, 1999 || Socorro || LINEAR || — || align=right | 5.8 km || 
|-id=962 bgcolor=#d6d6d6
| 91962 ||  || — || November 4, 1999 || Socorro || LINEAR || — || align=right | 5.1 km || 
|-id=963 bgcolor=#d6d6d6
| 91963 ||  || — || November 4, 1999 || Socorro || LINEAR || — || align=right | 5.4 km || 
|-id=964 bgcolor=#d6d6d6
| 91964 ||  || — || November 4, 1999 || Socorro || LINEAR || — || align=right | 6.4 km || 
|-id=965 bgcolor=#d6d6d6
| 91965 ||  || — || November 5, 1999 || Socorro || LINEAR || THM || align=right | 6.5 km || 
|-id=966 bgcolor=#d6d6d6
| 91966 ||  || — || November 5, 1999 || Socorro || LINEAR || — || align=right | 7.6 km || 
|-id=967 bgcolor=#E9E9E9
| 91967 ||  || — || November 9, 1999 || Socorro || LINEAR || MAR || align=right | 2.8 km || 
|-id=968 bgcolor=#d6d6d6
| 91968 ||  || — || November 9, 1999 || Socorro || LINEAR || — || align=right | 6.3 km || 
|-id=969 bgcolor=#d6d6d6
| 91969 ||  || — || November 9, 1999 || Socorro || LINEAR || — || align=right | 7.5 km || 
|-id=970 bgcolor=#E9E9E9
| 91970 ||  || — || November 9, 1999 || Socorro || LINEAR || — || align=right | 3.1 km || 
|-id=971 bgcolor=#d6d6d6
| 91971 ||  || — || November 9, 1999 || Socorro || LINEAR || KOR || align=right | 4.6 km || 
|-id=972 bgcolor=#d6d6d6
| 91972 ||  || — || November 9, 1999 || Socorro || LINEAR || EOS || align=right | 4.7 km || 
|-id=973 bgcolor=#d6d6d6
| 91973 ||  || — || November 9, 1999 || Socorro || LINEAR || — || align=right | 4.7 km || 
|-id=974 bgcolor=#d6d6d6
| 91974 ||  || — || November 9, 1999 || Socorro || LINEAR || — || align=right | 6.1 km || 
|-id=975 bgcolor=#d6d6d6
| 91975 ||  || — || November 9, 1999 || Socorro || LINEAR || THM || align=right | 4.4 km || 
|-id=976 bgcolor=#d6d6d6
| 91976 ||  || — || November 9, 1999 || Socorro || LINEAR || — || align=right | 4.0 km || 
|-id=977 bgcolor=#d6d6d6
| 91977 ||  || — || November 9, 1999 || Socorro || LINEAR || — || align=right | 6.1 km || 
|-id=978 bgcolor=#d6d6d6
| 91978 ||  || — || November 9, 1999 || Socorro || LINEAR || THM || align=right | 3.7 km || 
|-id=979 bgcolor=#d6d6d6
| 91979 ||  || — || November 9, 1999 || Socorro || LINEAR || — || align=right | 6.8 km || 
|-id=980 bgcolor=#d6d6d6
| 91980 ||  || — || November 9, 1999 || Socorro || LINEAR || — || align=right | 6.9 km || 
|-id=981 bgcolor=#d6d6d6
| 91981 ||  || — || November 9, 1999 || Socorro || LINEAR || HYG || align=right | 8.2 km || 
|-id=982 bgcolor=#d6d6d6
| 91982 ||  || — || November 9, 1999 || Socorro || LINEAR || — || align=right | 4.7 km || 
|-id=983 bgcolor=#d6d6d6
| 91983 ||  || — || November 9, 1999 || Socorro || LINEAR || — || align=right | 3.6 km || 
|-id=984 bgcolor=#d6d6d6
| 91984 ||  || — || November 9, 1999 || Socorro || LINEAR || — || align=right | 7.3 km || 
|-id=985 bgcolor=#d6d6d6
| 91985 ||  || — || November 4, 1999 || Catalina || CSS || — || align=right | 6.8 km || 
|-id=986 bgcolor=#d6d6d6
| 91986 ||  || — || November 9, 1999 || Catalina || CSS || — || align=right | 6.4 km || 
|-id=987 bgcolor=#d6d6d6
| 91987 ||  || — || November 9, 1999 || Catalina || CSS || TEL || align=right | 3.5 km || 
|-id=988 bgcolor=#d6d6d6
| 91988 ||  || — || November 9, 1999 || Catalina || CSS || EOS || align=right | 4.2 km || 
|-id=989 bgcolor=#d6d6d6
| 91989 ||  || — || November 9, 1999 || Catalina || CSS || EOS || align=right | 4.6 km || 
|-id=990 bgcolor=#d6d6d6
| 91990 ||  || — || November 4, 1999 || Kitt Peak || Spacewatch || — || align=right | 4.7 km || 
|-id=991 bgcolor=#d6d6d6
| 91991 ||  || — || November 4, 1999 || Kitt Peak || Spacewatch || — || align=right | 5.2 km || 
|-id=992 bgcolor=#d6d6d6
| 91992 ||  || — || November 4, 1999 || Kitt Peak || Spacewatch || KOR || align=right | 2.7 km || 
|-id=993 bgcolor=#d6d6d6
| 91993 ||  || — || November 5, 1999 || Kitt Peak || Spacewatch || EOS || align=right | 3.0 km || 
|-id=994 bgcolor=#d6d6d6
| 91994 ||  || — || November 6, 1999 || Kitt Peak || Spacewatch || — || align=right | 5.1 km || 
|-id=995 bgcolor=#d6d6d6
| 91995 ||  || — || November 10, 1999 || Kitt Peak || Spacewatch || EOS || align=right | 3.8 km || 
|-id=996 bgcolor=#d6d6d6
| 91996 ||  || — || November 10, 1999 || Kitt Peak || Spacewatch || LUT || align=right | 6.9 km || 
|-id=997 bgcolor=#d6d6d6
| 91997 ||  || — || November 8, 1999 || Socorro || LINEAR || — || align=right | 5.1 km || 
|-id=998 bgcolor=#d6d6d6
| 91998 ||  || — || November 12, 1999 || Socorro || LINEAR || THM || align=right | 4.2 km || 
|-id=999 bgcolor=#d6d6d6
| 91999 ||  || — || November 10, 1999 || Kitt Peak || Spacewatch || — || align=right | 5.8 km || 
|-id=000 bgcolor=#d6d6d6
| 92000 ||  || — || November 11, 1999 || Catalina || CSS || EUP || align=right | 8.7 km || 
|}

References

External links 
 Discovery Circumstances: Numbered Minor Planets (90001)–(95000) (IAU Minor Planet Center)

0091